This is a list of professionally authenticated paintings, drawings, and sculptures by Thomas Eakins (1844–1916). As there is no catalogue raisonné of Eakins' works, this is an aggregation of existing published catalogs.

Background 

During his lifetime, Thomas Eakins sold few paintings. On his death, ownership of his unsold works passed to his widow, Susan Macdowell Eakins, who kept them in their Philadelphia home. She dedicated the remaining years of her life to burnishing his legacy. In this, she was quite successful; in the period between Thomas Eakins' death and her own, she donated many of the strongest remaining pictures to museums around the world. The Philadelphia Museum of Art benefited particularly from these donations.

After Susan Macdowell Eakins' death in 1938, her executors emptied the house of anything which could be sold at auction. When former Eakins student Charles Bregler arrived at the house after it had been stripped he was horrified at what he found, describing it as the "most tragic and pitiful sight I ever saw. Every room was cluttered with debris as all the contents of the various drawers, closets etc were thrown upon the floor as they removed the furniture. All the life casts were smashed... I never want to see anything like this again." The number of works lost or destroyed at this time will never be known.

Bregler carefully collected what was left. Most of what remained were drawings and other preparatory studies. He was highly secretive about the contents of his collection and rarely allowed anyone to see it. After Bregler's death, ownership of the collection passed to his second wife, Mary Louise Picozzi Bregler, who was even more guarded as to its contents. In 1986, shortly before her death, Mary Bregler agreed to sell the works to the Pennsylvania Academy of the Fine Arts.

Historiography 

In the early 1930s, Susan Macdowell Eakins invited art historian Lloyd Goodrich into her home. Goodrich inventoried the collection in the house, interviewed Eakins' surviving associates, and studied Eakins' personal notes. In 1933, Goodrich published Thomas Eakins: His Life and Works. Though it was incomplete, un-illustrated, and did not include Eakins' photographs, Goodrich's book was the first definitive study of Eakins and the first attempt to catalog his artistic output.

In the 1970s, Gordon Hendricks published two Eakins catalogs. The Photographs of Thomas Eakins (1972) is a fully illustrated catalog of photographs by Thomas Eakins and his associates. Because Eakins did not keep detailed records of his photographs, nor did he sign, title, or date them, many of the dates and photographers listed in the catalog are educated guesses on Hendricks' part. It is difficult to know who took a particular photograph because Eakins often had his students use it. Hence, the attribution on many of these photographs is "Circle of Eakins" to indicate that a photograph was taken either by Eakins or one of his associates. The Life and Work of Thomas Eakins (1974) included a checklist of Eakins' works, a number of which had not been included in the 1933 Goodrich catalog.

In the 1980s, Lloyd Goodrich returned to the subject of Thomas Eakins. He began writing a three-volume book, Thomas Eakins. The first two volumes, published in 1982, were biographic in nature. Goodrich was unable to complete the third volume, a Thomas Eakins catalogue raisonné, before he died in 1987. He donated his papers to the Philadelphia Museum of Art, in the hopes that the curators there would finish the catalogue raisonné. This has not happened.

Until 1986, the Charles Bregler collection was effectively unknown to art historians. A few of the works in the Bregler collection were included in the 1933 Goodrich catalog, but after that they effectively disappeared from the scholarly community. A proper inventory became possible only after their 1986 sale to the Pennsylvania Academy of Fine Arts. In 1997, art historian Kathleen Foster published a definitive catalog of the Bregler collection, Thomas Eakins Rediscovered.

List organization 

Paintings, drawings, and sculptures are listed, where possible, by their Goodrich catalog number supplemented with modifications from Goodrich's notes for his never-completed Eakins catalogue raisonné. The Goodrich catalog can be subdivided into three parts:

 Juvenalia – Goodrich classified several early works by Thomas Eakins (works made prior to Eakins' arrival in Paris) as juvenalia, and prefaced with a "J". Though mentioned throughout the Eakins literature, the catalog itself was not published. However, the list is accessible in the Goodrich papers in the Philadelphia archives.
 1933 catalog works – "G" followed by a number indicates it is from Goodrich's 1933 Eakins catalog.
 1980s catalog works – "G" followed by a number and then a letter indicates a work that was not included in the 1933 Goodrich catalog, but was included in his two volume Thomas Eakins, or in notes for the third volume, the never-finished catalog.

Works in the Charles Bregler collection at the Pennsylvania Academy of the Fine Arts are listed according to their number in Thomas Eakins Rediscovered.

Goodrich catalogue of Eakins' paintings and sculptures 
{| class="wikitable sortable plainrowheaders" style="width: 100%"
|-
! scope="col" | Title
! scope="col" | Catalog #
! scope="col" | Image
! scope="col" | Format
! scope="col" | Year
! scope="col" | Dimensions (inches)
! scope="col" | Collection
! scope="col" | Notes
|-
! scope="row" | Map of Switzerland
| J1
| 
| Pen, ink, and watercolor on paper
| c. 1856–1857
| 
| Hirshhorn Museum and Sculpture Garden, Washington, D.C.
| 
|-
! scope="row" | Map of France, Spain, Portugal, and Italy
| J2
| 
| Pen, ink, and watercolor on paper
| c. 1856–1857
| 16 × 20
| Collection of Mr. and Mrs. Francis Walters
|
|-
! scope="row" | Spanish Scene: Peasant Crossing a Stream
| J3
| 
| Pencil and chalk on paper
| March 1858
| 10 1/16 × 14 7/16
| Hirshhorn Museum and Sculpture Garden, Washington, D.C.
|
|-
! scope="row" | Spanish Scene: Peasants and Travellers Among Ruins
| J4
| 
| Pencil and ink on paper
| 1858
| 11½ × 16 15/16
| Hirshhorn Museum and Sculpture Garden, Washington, D.C.
|
|-
! scope="row" | Camel and Rider
| J5
| 
| Pencil and ink on paper
| 1858
| 
| Collection of Mr. and Mrs. Daniel Dietrich II
|
|-
! scope="row" | Perspective of a Lathe
| J6
| 
| Pencil and ink on paper
| 1860
| 16 5/16 × 22
| Hirshhorn Museum and Sculpture Garden, Washington, D.C.
|
|-
! scope="row" | Drawing of Gears
| J7
| 
| Pen, ink, and pencil on paper
| c. 1860
| 11 7/16 × 16⅞
| Hirshhorn Museum and Sculpture Garden, Washington, D.C.
|
|-
! scope="row" | Visiting Card with Landscape
| J8
| 
| 
| c. late 1850s
| 
| Hirshhorn Museum and Sculpture Garden, Washington, D.C.
|
|-
! scope="row" | Machinery
| J9
|
| 
| c. 1860
| 
| 
| 
|-
! scope="row" | The Icosahedron
| J10
| 
| 
| c. 1860
| 
| Pennsylvania Academy of the Fine Arts, Philadelphia, Pennsylvania
|
|-
! scope="row" | "Freedom"
| J11
| 
| 
| c. 1860
|
| Pennsylvania Academy of the Fine Arts, Philadelphia, Pennsylvania
| A drawing after the Statue of Freedom by Thomas Crawford
|-
! scope="row" | Nude woman, seated, wearing a mask
| 1
| 
| Charcoal on paper
| c. 1863–1866
| 24¼ × 18⅝ inches
| Philadelphia Museum of Art, Philadelphia, Pennsylvania
|
|-
! scope="row" | Nude woman, back turned
| 2
| 
| Charcoal on paper
| 
| 
| Philadelphia Museum of Art, Philadelphia, Pennsylvania
|
|-
! scope="row" | Nude boy
| 3
| 
| Charcoal on paper
| 
| 
| Philadelphia Museum of Art, Philadelphia, Pennsylvania
|
|-
! scope="row" | Nude man, seated
| 4
| 
| Charcoal on paper
| 
| 
| Philadelphia Museum of Art, Philadelphia, Pennsylvania
|
|-
! scope="row" | Nude woman reclining, back turned
| 5
| 
| Charcoal on paper
| 
| 
| Philadelphia Museum of Art, Philadelphia, Pennsylvania
|
|-
! scope="row" | Nude woman, reclining, seen from the front
| 6
| 
| Charcoal on paper
| 
| 
| Philadelphia Museum of Art, Philadelphia, Pennsylvania
|
|-
! scope="row" | Head, bust and arm of a child
| 7
| 
| Charcoal on paper
| 
| 
| Philadelphia Museum of Art, Philadelphia, Pennsylvania
|
|-
! scope="row" | Arm resting on the back of a chair
| 8
| 
| Charcoal on paper
| 
| 
| Philadelphia Museum of Art, Philadelphia, Pennsylvania
|
|-
! scope="row" | Nude man with a beard, seated on the floor
| 9
| 
| Charcoal on paper
| 1869
| 
| Philadelphia Museum of Art, Philadelphia, Pennsylvania
| On the reverse is the middle section of a nude man.
|-
! scope="row" | Nude man standing
| 10
|
| Charcoal on paper
| 
| 
| 
| 
|-
! scope="row" | Legs of a seated model
| 11
| 
| Charcoal on paper
| 
| 
| Newark Museum, Newark, New Jersey
|
|-
! scope="row" | Legs of a standing model
| 12
|
| Charcoal on paper
| 
| 
| 
| 
|-
! scope="row" | Head and bust of an Arab man with a turban
| 13
| 
| Charcoal on paper
| 1866–1867
| 
| Fine Arts Museums of San Francisco, San Francisco
|
|-
! scope="row" | Torso and arm of a nude man
| 14
|
| Charcoal on paper
| 
| 
| 
| 
|-
! scope="row" | Nude woman reclining on a couch
| 15
| 
| Charcoal on paper
| 1863–1866
| 
| Fogg Art Museum, Cambridge, Massachusetts
|
|-
! scope="row" | Nude woman reclining, wearing a mask
| 16
|
| Charcoal on paper
| 
| 
| 
| 
|-
! scope="row" | Nude woman standing
| 17
|
| Charcoal on paper
| 1876
| 
| 
| 
|-
! scope="row" | Nude man seated
| 18
| 
| Charcoal on paper
| c. 1869
|
| 
| Double sided with "Head of a Warrior".Auctioned at Christie's NY, December 8, 2008; sold for $50,000
|-
! scope="row" | Illustrated letter to his Mother, Nov. 8–9, 1866
| 18A
| 
| 
| 
| 
| Hirshhorn Museum and Sculpture Garden, Washington, D.C.
|
|-
! scope="row" | Antique study, female head
| 19
|
| Oil on heavy paper
| c. 1867–1869
|
| 
| Lost
|-
! scope="row" | Antique study, male roman head
| 20
|
| Oil on canvas
| c. 1867–1869
| 
| 
| Lost
|-
! scope="row" | Study of a leg
| 21
| 
| Oil on heavy paper
| c. 1867–1869
| 
| Joslyn Art Museum, Omaha, Nebraska
|
|-
! scope="row" | Study of a ram's head
| 22
|
| Oil on canvas
| c. 1867–1869
| 
| 
| Lost
|-
! scope="row" | Study of a girl's head
| 23
| 
| Oil on canvas
| c. 1868–1869
| 
|
| Private collection
|-
! scope="row" | Study of a girl's head
| 24
| 
| Oil on canvas
| c. 1867–1874
| 
| Hirshhorn Museum and Sculpture Garden, Washington, D.C.
|
|-
! scope="row" | Study of a girl's head
| 25
| 
| Oil on canvas
| c. 1867–1869
| 
| Philadelphia Museum of Art, Philadelphia, Pennsylvania
|
|-
! scope="row" | The Strong Man
| 26
| 
| Oil on canvas
| c. 1867–1869
| 
| Philadelphia Museum of Art, Philadelphia, Pennsylvania
| Study
|-
! scope="row" | Bust of a Man (Study of a Nude Man)
| 27
| 
| Oil on canvas
| c. 1867–1869
| 
| Philadelphia Museum of Art, Philadelphia, Pennsylvania
|
|-
! scope="row" | Study of a student's head
| 28
| 
| Oil on canvas mounted on cardboard
| c. 1867–1878
| 
| 
| Thought to have been lost.Auctioned at Sotheby's NY, May 2001; sold for $46,750.
|-
! scope="row" | Study of a student's head
| 29
| 
| Oil on canvas mounted on cardboard
| c. 1867–1879
| 
| Collection of William E. Stokes
|
|-
! scope="row" | Female Model(formerly called A Negress)
| 30
| 
| Oil on canvas
| 
| 
| M. H. de Young Memorial Museum, San Francisco, California
|
|-
! scope="row" | Scene in a Cathedral
| 31
| 
| Oil on canvas
| 
| 
| 
|Deaccessioned from the Hirshhorn Museum and Sculpture Garden.Auctioned at Christie's NY, December 1, 2010; sold for $18,750.
|-
! scope="row" | Carmelita Requena
| 32
| 
| Oil on canvas
| 1869
| 
| Metropolitan Museum of Art, New York City, New York
|
|-
! scope="row" | A Street Scene in Seville
| 33
| 
| Oil on canvas
| 1870
|  
| Collection of Erving and Joyce Wolf
|
|-
! scope="row" | A Spanish Woman (Also known as "Dolores")
| 34
| 
| Oil on canvas
| 
| 
| 
| 
|-
! scope="row" | Francis Eakins
| 35
| 
| Oil on canvas
| Late 1870/Early 1871
| 
| Nelson-Atkins Museum of Art, Kansas City, Missouri
|
|-
! scope="row" | At the Piano
| 36
| 
| Oil on canvas
| Late 1870/Early 1871
| 
| Blanton Museum of Art, Austin, Texas
|
|-
! scope="row" | Home Scene
| 37
| 
| Oil on canvas
| Late 1870/Early 1871
| 
| Brooklyn Museum of Art, New York City
|
|-
! scope="row" | Benjamin Eakins
| 38
| 
| Watercolor on paper
| c. 1870
| 
| Private collection
|
|-
! scope="row" | Margaret in Skating Costume
| 39
| 
| Oil on canvas
| 1871
|  
| Philadelphia Museum of Art, Philadelphia, Pennsylvania
|
|-
! scope="row" | Margaret (study)
| 40
| 
| Oil on canvas
| c. 1871
|
| 
| Deaccessioned from Hirshhorn Museum and Sculpture Garden.Auctioned at Sotheby's NY, May 19, 2010, Lot 109.
|-
! scope="row" | Margaret (sketch)
| 41
| 
| Oil on canvas
| c. 1871
| 
| Mitchell Museum at Cedarhurst, Mount Vernon, Illinois
|
|-
! scope="row" | Hiawatha
| 42
|
| Watercolor on paper
| 
| 
| 
| No longer exists.
|-
! scope="row" | Hiawatha
| 43
| 
| Oil on canvas
| 
| 
| Hirshhorn Museum and Sculpture Garden, Washington, D.C.
| Study for Hiawatha watercolor. Described erroneously as unfinished.
|-
! scope="row" | Max Schmitt in a Single Scull
| 44
| 
| Oil on canvas
| 1871
| 
| Metropolitan Museum of Art, New York
|
|-
! scope="row" | Drawing of the Girard Avenue Bridge
| 44A
| 
| Drawing
| 
| 
| Hirshhorn Museum and Sculpture Garden, Washington, D.C.
| Double sided: reverse side depicts the sketch for an oar.
|-
! scope="row" | Portrait of M.H. Messchert
| 44B
|
| Painting
| 
| 
| 
| 
|-
! scope="row" | Kathrin (Girl with a cat)
| 45
| 
| Oil on canvas
| 1872
| 
| Yale University Art Gallery, New Haven, Connecticut
|
|-
! scope="row" | Study for Kathrin
| 45A
| 
| Drawing
| 
| 
| 
| 
|-
! scope="row" | Elizabeth Crowell and her Dog
| 46
| 
| Oil on canvas
| Early 1870s
| 
| San Diego Museum of Art, San Diego, California
|
|-
! scope="row" | Mrs. James W. Crowell
| 47
| 
| Oil on canvas
| Early 1870s
| 
| 
| 
|-
! scope="row" | Grouse
| 48
| 
| Oil on canvas
| 1872
| 
| Mint Museum of Art, Charlotte, North Carolina
|
|-
! scope="row" | The Pair-Oared Shell
| 49
| 
| Oil on canvas
| 1872
| 
| Philadelphia Museum of Art, Philadelphia, Pennsylvania
|
|-
! scope="row" | Perspective Drawing for The Pair-Oared Shell
| 50
| 
| Pencil and ink on paper mounted on cardboard
| 
| 
| Philadelphia Museum of Art, Philadelphia, Pennsylvania
|
|-
! scope="row" | Perspective Drawing for The Pair-Oared Shell
| 51
| 
| Pencil, ink, and watercolor on paper mounted on cardboard
| 1872
| 
| Philadelphia Museum of Art, Philadelphia, Pennsylvania
|
|-
! scope="row" | The Biglin Brothers Turning the Stake
| 52
| 
| Oil on canvas
| 1873
| 
| Cleveland Museum of Art, Cleveland, Ohio
|
|-
! scope="row" | Perspective Drawing for the Biglin Brothers Turning the Stake
| 52A
| 
| Drawing
| 
| 
| Cleveland Museum of Art, Cleveland, Ohio
|
|-
! scope="row" | Perspective Drawing for the Biglin Brothers Turning the Stake
| 53
| 
| Pencil and ink on paper mounted on cardboard
| 1873
| 
| Hirshhorn Museum and Sculpture Garden, Washington, D.C.
|
|-
! scope="row" | The Pair-Oared Race – John and Barney Biglin Turning the Stake
| 54
|
| Watercolor
| 1874
| 
| 
| Lost
|-
! scope="row" | A Rower
| 55
|
| Watercolor
| 
| 
| 
| Given to Jean-Léon Gérôme by Thomas Eakins. "Present location unknown"
|-
! scope="row" | John Biglin (also known as "The Sculler")
| 56
| 
| Watercolor
| 1874
| 16⅞ × 23 15/16
| Yale University Art Gallery, New Haven, Connecticut
|
|-
! scope="row" | John Biglin in a Single Scull
| 57
| 
| Watercolor on paper
| 1873 or early 1874
| 19 5/16 × 24⅞ 
| Metropolitan Museum of Art, New York
|
|-
! scope="row" | Perspective Drawing for John Biglin in a Single Scull
| 58
| 
| Pencil and ink on paper mounted on cardboard
| c. 1874
| 27⅜ × 45¼
| Museum of Fine Arts, Boston, Boston, Massachusetts
|
|-
! scope="row" | John Biglin in a Single Scull
| 59
| 
| Oil on canvas
| 1873–1874
| 24⅜ × 16
| Yale University Art Gallery, New Haven, Connecticut
|
|-
! scope="row" | John Biglin in a Single Scull
| 60
|
| Watercolor
| 1873–1874
| 
|
| Given to Jean-Léon Gérôme by Thomas Eakins.
|-
! scope="row" | The Biglin Brothers Racing
| 61
| 
| Oil on canvas
| Probably 1873
| 
| National Gallery of Art, Washington, D.C.
|
|-
! scope="row" | Perspective Drawing for the Biglin Brothers Racing
| 62
| 
| Pencil and ink on paper mounted on cardboard
| 
| 
| Hirshhorn Museum and Sculpture Garden, Washington, D.C.
|
|-
! scope="row" | Oarsmen on the Schuylkill
| 63
| 
| Oil on canvas
| c. 1873
| 
| Private Collection. 
| Deaccessioned from Brooklyn Museum of Art.
|-
! scope="row" | Oarsman in a Single Scull (also known as "Sketch of Max Schmitt in a Single Scull")
| 64
| 
| Oil on canvas
| 
| 
| Philadelphia Museum of Art, Philadelphia, Pennsylvania
|
|-
! scope="row" | Oarsmen
| 65
| 
| Oil on canvas
| Probably c. 1873
| 
| Portland Art Museum, Portland, Oregon
|
|-
! scope="row" | The Schreiber Brothers
| 66
| 
| Oil on canvas
| 1874
| 
| Yale University Art Gallery, New Haven, Connecticut
|
|-
! scope="row" | Perspective Drawing
| 67
| 
| Pencil and ink on paper mounted on cardboard
| 
| 
| Pennsylvania Academy of the Fine Arts, Philadelphia, Pennsylvania
|
|-
! scope="row" | The Artist and His Father Hunting Reed Birds
| 68
| 
| Oil on canvas
| c. 1874
| 
| Virginia Museum of Fine Arts, Richmond, Virginia
|
|-
! scope="row" | Perspective Drawing for the Artist and His Father Hunting Reed Birds
| 69
| 
| Pencil and ink on paper mounted on cardboard
| 
| 
| 
| 
|-
! scope="row" | Pushing for the Rail
| 70
| 
| Oil on canvas
| 1874
| 
| Metropolitan Museum of Art, New York
|
|-
! scope="row" | Whistling for Plover
| 71
| 
| Watercolor on paper
| 1874
| 
| Brooklyn Museum of Art, New York
|
|-
! scope="row" | Whistling for Plover
| 72
|
| Oil
| 
| 
| 
| 
|-
! scope="row" | Sketch for Hunting
| 73
| 
| Oil on canvas mounted on cardboard
| c. 1874
| 
| Collection of Jamie Wyeth
|
|-
| Studies of Game-Birds (Also known as "Plover")
| 74
| 
| Oil on canvas mounted on cardboard
| 
| 
| Virginia Museum of Fine Arts, Richmond, Virginia
|
|-
! scope="row" | Landscape with a Dog
| 75
| 
| Oil on canvas
| 
| 
| Philadelphia Museum of Art, Philadelphia, Pennsylvania
|
|-
! scope="row" | Sailboats Racing on the Delaware
| 76
| 
| Oil on canvas
| 1874
| 
| Philadelphia Museum of Art, Philadelphia, Pennsylvania
|
|-
! scope="row" | Sailing
| 77
| 
| Oil on canvas
| c. 1874
| 
| Philadelphia Museum of Art, Philadelphia, Pennsylvania
|
|-
! scope="row" | Starting Out After Rail
| 78
| 
| Oil on canvas
| 1874
| 
| Museum of Fine Arts, Boston, Boston, Massachusetts
|
|-
! scope="row" | Starting Out After Rail
| 79
| 
| Watercolor
| 1874
| 
| Wichita Art Museum, Wichita, Kansas
|
|-
! scope="row" | Ships and Sailboats on the Delaware (also known as "Becalmed")
| 80
| 
| Oil on canvas
| 1874
| 
| Wadsworth Atheneum, Hartford, Connecticut
|
|-
! scope="row" | Study for Ships and Sailboats on the Delaware
| 81
| 
| Oil on canvas mounted on cardboard
| 
| 
| Pennsylvania Academy of the Fine Arts, Philadelphia, Pennsylvania
|
|-
! scope="row" | Ships and Sailboats on the Delaware
| 82
| 
| Oil on canvas
| 1874
| 
| Philadelphia Museum of Art, Philadelphia, Pennsylvania
|
|-
! scope="row" | Drifting
| 83
| 
| Watercolor
| c. 1874
| 
| National Gallery of Art, Washington, D.C.
|
|-
! scope="row" | Mrs. Benjamin Eakins
| 84
| 
| Oil on canvas
| c. 1874
| 
| Collection of Mr. and Mrs. Daniel Dietrich II
|
|-
! scope="row" | Portrait of Professor Benjamin H. Rand
| 85
| 
| Oil on canvas
| 1874
| 
| Crystal Bridges Museum of American Art, Bentonville, Arkansas
| Deaccessioned from Thomas Jefferson University, Philadelphia, Pennsylvania, April 2007 (after 130 years in the collection).
|-
! scope="row" | Baseball Players Practicing
| 86
| 
| Watercolor on paper
| 1875
| 
| Rhode Island School of Design Museum, Providence, Rhode Island
|
|-
! scope="row" | Perspective drawing for Baseball Players practicing
| 86A
| 
| Drawing
| 
| 
| Hirshhorn Museum and Sculpture Garden, Washington, D.C.
|
|-
! scope="row" | Elizabeth at the Piano
| 87
| 
| Oil on canvas
| 1875
| 
| Addison Gallery of American Art, Andover, Massachusetts
|
|-
! scope="row" | The Gross Clinic
| 88
| 
| Oil on canvas
| 1875
| 
| Philadelphia Museum of Art and the Pennsylvania Academy of the Fine Arts, Philadelphia, Pennsylvania
|
|-
! scope="row" | Sketch for the Gross Clinic
| 89
| 
| Oil on canvas
| 1875
| 
| Philadelphia Museum of Art, Philadelphia, Pennsylvania
|
|-
! scope="row" | Dr. Gross (Study for "The Gross Clinic)
| 90
| 
| Oil on canvas
| 1875
| 
| Worcester Art Museum, Worcester, Massachusetts
|
|-
! scope="row" | Black and White version
| 91
| 
| India ink on cardboard
| 1875
| 
| Metropolitan Museum of Art, New York
| Drawn after the painting, to be photographed and reproduced as a collotype.
|-
! scope="row" | Drawing of Two Heads
| 92
| 
| "India ink on paper, with pen and brush"
| 1876
| 
| Philadelphia Museum of Art, Philadelphia, Pennsylvania
|
|-
! scope="row" | Robert C.V. Meyers
| 93
| 
| Oil on brown paper
| 1875
| 
| Collection of Mr. and Mrs. Daniel Dietrich II
|
|-
! scope="row" | The Zither Player
| 94
| 
| Watercolor on paper
| 1876
| 
| Art Institute of Chicago, Chicago, Illinois
|
|-
! scope="row" | J. Harry Lewis
| 95
| 
| Oil on canvas
| 1876
| 
| Philadelphia Museum of Art, Philadelphia, Pennsylvania
|
|-
! scope="row" | The Chess Players
| 96
| 
| Wood
| 1876
| 
| Metropolitan Museum of Art, New York
|
|-
! scope="row" | Perspective Drawing for the Chess Players
| 97
| 
| Pencil and ink on paper
| 1875–1876
| 
| Metropolitan Museum of Art, New York
|
|-
! scope="row" | M. Gardel
| 98
| 
| Oil on paper mounted on cardboard
| 
| 
| Philadelphia Museum of Art, Philadelphia, Pennsylvania
|
|-
! scope="row" | Baby at Play
| 99
| 
| Oil on canvas
| 1876
| 
| National Gallery of Art, Washington, DC.
|
|-
! scope="row" | Studies of a Baby
| 100
| 
| Oil on canvas
| 
| 
| Duke-Semans Fine Arts Foundation (in the care of the Nasher Museum of Art, Durham, North Carolina)
| Double sided.
|-
! scope="row" | Dr. John H. Brinton
| 101
| 
| Oil on canvas
| 1876
|
|The National Museum of Health and Medicine of the Armed Forces Institute of Pathology, Washington, D.C. On long-term loan to the National Gallery of Art
| Dr. Brinton was a close friend of Eakins's, and succeeded Dr. Samuel D. Gross as chair of surgery at Jefferson Medical College.(See G-126 for Eakins's portrait of Mrs. Brinton.)
|-
! scope="row" | Mrs. Samuel Hall Williams (Portrait of Abbie Williams)
| 102
| 
| Wood
| c. 1876
| 
|
| Deaccessioned from the Art Institute of Chicago.Auctioned at Christie's NY, September 27, 2011; sold for $134,500.
|-
! scope="row" | Columbus in Prison
| 103
| 
| Oil on canvas
| c. 1876
| 
| Kennedy Galleries, New York
|
|-
! scope="row" | Sketch for the Surrender of General Lee to General Grant at Appomattox
| 103A
| 
| Oil on canvas
| 
| 
|
| Deaccessioned from the Hirshhorn Museum and Sculpture Garden.Auctioned at Christie's NY, September 27, 2011; sold for $32,500.
|-
! scope="row" | Sketch for the Surrender of General Lee to General Grant at Appomattox
| 103B
| 
| Oil on canvas
| 
| 
| Museum of Fine Arts, Boston, Boston, Massachusetts
|
|-
! scope="row" | Will Schuster and Blackman Going Shooting
| 104
| 
| Oil on canvas
| 1876
|  
| Yale University Art Gallery, New Haven, Connecticut
|
|-
! scope="row" | Perspective Drawing for Will Schuster and Blackman Going Shooting
| 104A
| 
| Drawing
| 
| 
| Collection of Mr. and Mrs. Daniel Dietrich II
|
|-
! scope="row" | Rail Shooting
| 105
| 
| Oil on canvas
| 
| 
| 
| "Present whereabouts or existence unknown"
|-
! scope="row" | In Grandmother's Time
| 106
| 
| Oil on canvas
| 1876
| 
| Smith College Museum of Art, Northampton, Massachusetts
|
|-
! scope="row" | In Grandmother's Time
| 106A
| 
| Oil on wood
| 
| 
| 
| Originally double sided with G-106B until the two images were split
|-
! scope="row" | Landscape
| 106B
| 
| Oil on wood
| 
| 
| 
| Originally double sided with G-106A until the two images were splitDeassessioned from Hirshhorn Museum and Sculpture Garden.Auctioned at Christie's NY, March 23, 2016, Lot 57.<ref>Landscape, from Christie's NY.</ref>
|-
! scope="row" | Archbishop James Frederick Wood
| 107
| 
| Oil on canvas
| 1877
| 
| Crystal Bridges Museum of American Art, Bentonville, Arkansas
| Deaccessioned from St. Charles Borromeo Seminary, Wynnewood, Pennsylvania, 2015.
|-
! scope="row" | Study for the portrait of James Frederick Wood
| 108
| 
| Oil on canvas
| 1876
| 
| Yale University Art Gallery, New Haven, Connecticut
|
|-
! scope="row" | Scenes in a Cathedral
| 108A, 108B, 108C, 108D, 108E, 108F, 108G, 108H, 108I
| 
| Drawings
| 
| 
| Hirshhorn Museum and Sculpture Garden, Washington, D.C.
|
|-
! scope="row" | William Rush and His Model
| 109
| 
| Oil on canvas
| 1876–1877
| 
| Philadelphia Museum of Art, Philadelphia, Pennsylvania
|
|-
! scope="row" | Studies for "William Rush"
| 109A, 109B, 109C, 109D, 109E, 109F, 109G, 109H,
| 
| Drawings
| 
| 
| Hirshhorn Museum and Sculpture Garden, Washington, D.C.
|
|-
! scope="row" | Study for William Rush and His Model (Yale), G-111
| 110
| 
| Oil on cardboard,
| c. 1877
| 8¼ × 10½
| Farnsworth Art Museum, Rockland, Maine
|
|-
! scope="row" | William Rush and His Model (Yale)
| 111
| 
| Oil on canvas
| 1876
| 
| Yale University Art Gallery, New Haven, Connecticut
|
|-
! scope="row" | Interior of Rush's Shop
| 112
| 
| Oil on canvas
| 1876–1877
| 
| Philadelphia Museum of Art, Philadelphia, Pennsylvania
|
|-
! scope="row" | The Model (Nude: Study)Study for William Rush and His Model (Yale), G-111
| 113
| 
| Oil on canvas
| 1876
| 
| Art Institute of Chicago, Chicago, Illinois
|
|-
! scope="row" | Seventy Years Ago
| 114
| 
| Watercolor on paper
| 1877
| 
| Princeton University Art Museum, Princeton, New Jersey
|
|-
! scope="row" | Sketch for Seventy Years Ago
| 115
| 
| Oil on canvas
| 
| 
| Seattle Art Museum, Seattle, Washington
|
|-
! scope="row" | Young Girl Meditating
| 116
| 
| Watercolor on paper
| 1877
| 
| Metropolitan Museum of Art, New York
|
|-
! scope="row" | Sketch for Young Girl Meditating
| 117
| 
| Oil on canvas
| 
| 
| Pennsylvania Academy of the Fine Arts, Philadelphia, Pennsylvania
|
|-
! scope="row" | Study for Young Girl Meditating
| 117A
| 
| Oil on canvas
| 1877
| 
| Collection of Martin Perez.
|
|-
! scope="row" | In Washington (Lafayette Park, Washington, D.C.)
| 118
| 
| Wood
| 1877
| 
| Philadelphia Museum of Art, Philadelphia, Pennsylvania
| Painted from a window of the White House, as Eakins waited for President Rutherford B. Hayes to sit for a portrait.
|-
! scope="row" | The Courtship
| 119
| 
| Oil on canvas
| c. 1878
| 
| M. H. de Young Memorial Museum, San Francisco, California
|
|-
! scope="row" | Study for The Courtship
| 120
| 
| Oil on canvas
| 1877-1878
| 14 × 17
|
| Auctioned at Christie's NY, June 3, 1983; sold for $80,000.Ex collection: Gulf States Paper Corporation, Tuscaloosa, Alabama (1983-2013).Auctioned at Christie's New York, September 25, 2013; sold for $32,500.
|-
! scope="row" | The Spinner (sketch for The Courtship)
| 121
| 
| Oil on canvas
| c. 1878
| 
| Worcester Art Museum, Worcester, Massachusetts
|
|-
! scope="row" | The Spinner (sketch for The Courtship)
| 122
| 
| Wood
| 
| 
| Private collection.
| The reverse side has a sketch of Dr. Andrews.
|-
! scope="row" | The Young Man (sketch for The Courtship)
| 123
|
| Oil on canvas
| 
| 
| 
| 
|-
! scope="row" | Anna Williams
| 123A
| 
| 
| 
| 
| 
| 
|-
! scope="row" | Study for Anna Williams
| 123B
| 
| 
| 
| 
| 
| 
|-
! scope="row" | Negro Boy Dancing (also known as "The Dancing Lesson")
| 124
| 
| Watercolor on paper
| 1878
| 
| Metropolitan Museum of Art, New York
|
|-
! scope="row" | Drawing for the Negro Boy dancing
| 124A
| 
| Drawing
| 1878
| 
| Pennsylvania Academy of the Fine Arts, Philadelphia, Pennsylvania
|
|-
! scope="row" | Study for Negro Boy Dancing
| 125
| 
| Oil on canvas
| 
| 
| National Gallery of Art, Washington, D.C.
|
|-
| Study for Negro Boy Dancing
|125A
| 
| 
| 
| 
| National Gallery of Art, Washington, D.C.
|
|-
! scope="row" | Mrs. John H. Brinton
| 126
| 
| Oil on canvas
| 1878
| 
| Collection of Mrs. Rodolphe Meyer de Schauensee
|Depicts Sarah (Ward) Brinton, wife of John H. Brinton (See G-101).
|-
! scope="row" | The Spelling Bee at Angel's
| 127
| 
| 
| 1878
| 
|
| Published in Scribner's Magazine, November 1878
|-
! scope="row" | Thar's a New Game Down in Frisco
| 127A
| 
| Oil on canvas
| 
| 
| Pennsylvania Academy of the Fine Arts, Philadelphia, Pennsylvania
| Study for the central standing figure in the Spelling Bee at Angel's. 
|-
! scope="row" | The Spelling Bee at Angel's
| 128
| 
| 
| 1878
| 
|
| Published in Scribner's Magazine, November 1878
|-
! scope="row" | Mr. Neelus Peeler's Conditions
| 129
| 
| Black ink and Chinese white on paper
| 1879
| 
| Brooklyn Museum of Art, New York
| Published in Scribner's Magazine, June 1879
|-
! scope="row" | Perspective drawing for Mr. Neelus Peeler's Conditions
| 129A
| 
| Drawing
| 
| 
| Hirshhorn Museum and Sculpture Garden, Washington, D.C.
|
|-
! scope="row" | Sketch for Mr. Neelus Peeler's Conditions
| 130
| 
| Wood
| 
| 
| New Britain Museum of American Art, New Britain, Connecticut
|Double sided. Often incorrectly referred to as "The Timer"
|-
! scope="row" | Four anatomical drawings
| 130A, 130B, 130C, 130D
| 
| Drawings
| 
| 
| Hirshhorn Museum and Sculpture Garden, Washington, D.C.
|
|-
! scope="row" | A Quiet Moment
| 131
|
| Oil on canvas
| 1879
| 
| 
| Lost
|-
! scope="row" | Sewing
| 132
| 
| Oil on wood
| c. 1879
| 
| New Britain Museum of American Art, New Britain, Connecticut
| Reverse side contains the sketch of an interior.
|-
! scope="row" | Study of a Woman Knitting
| 132A
| 
| Oil
| 
| 
| Hirshhorn Museum and Sculpture Garden, Washington, D.C.
|
|-
! scope="row" | The Fairman Rogers Four-in-Hand
| 133
| 
| Oil on canvas
| 1879–1880
| 
| Philadelphia Museum of Art, Philadelphia, Pennsylvania
|
|-
! scope="row" | Sketches for the Fairman Rogers Four-in-Hand
| 134
| 
| Oil on wood
| 1879
| 
| Philadelphia Museum of Art, Philadelphia, Pennsylvania
| Double sided: one side depicts the coach being driven across the picture; the other side is a study of Mrs. Rogers.
|-
! scope="row" | Landscape sketch for the Fairman Rogers Four-in-Hand
| 135
| Reverse of G135 as it appeared in 1933.
| Oil on wood
| 
| 
| 
| Originally composed of five or six sketches, which were later split.
|-
! scope="row" | Study of the Delaware River
| 135A
| 
| Oil
| 
| 
| 
| Originally part of G-135 until they were split.
|-
! scope="row" | Study of a Man's Head for Mending the Net
| 135B
| 
| Oil
| 
| 
| Private Collection.
| Originally part of G-135 until they were split.Auctioned at Christie's NY, May 19, 2005, Lot 1520; sold for $38,400.
|-
! scope="row" | Study of a Woman's Head for Mending the Net
| 135C
| 
| Oil
| 
| 
| 
| Originally part of G-135 until they were split.
|-
! scope="row" | Landscape sketch for the Fairman Rogers Four-in-Hand
| 136
| 
| Oil on wood
| 
| 
| Philadelphia Museum of Art, Philadelphia, Pennsylvania
| Double sided: one side is a study in Fairmount park. The other is a color note.
|-
! scope="row" | Study of Horse for The Fairman Rogers Four-in-Hand
| 137
| 
| Oil on wood
| 1879
| 
| 
| Originally double sided with 137A until the two images were splitDeaccessioned from Hirshhorn Museum and Sculpture Garden.Auctioned at Sotheby's NY (in a lot with G-137A, G-199A & G-201A), May 21, 2009; the lot sold for $119,500.
|-
! scope="row" | Study of Horses for The Fairman Rogers Four-in-Hand
| 137A
| 
| Oil on canvas
| 1879
| 
| 
| Originally double sided with 137 until the two images were splitDeaccessioned from Hirshhorn Museum and Sculpture Garden.Auctioned at Sotheby's NY (in a lot with G-137, G-199A & G-201A), May 21, 2009; the lot sold for $119,500. 
|-
! scope="row" | Fan
| 137B
| 
| 
| 
| 
| 
| Sold at auction, January 24, 1994, for $160,000.
|-
! scope="row" | General George Cadwalader
| 138
| 
| Oil on canvas
| 1880
| 
| Butler Institute of American Art, Youngstown, Ohio
|
|-
! scope="row" | General George Cadwalader
| 139
| 
| Oil on canvas
| 1880
| 
| 
| Painted posthumously from a carte-de-visite.Deassessioned from the collection of the Mutual Assurance Company of Philadelphia.
Offered for auction at Sotheby's New York, November 13, 2017. Unsold.
|-
! scope="row" | Retrospection
| 140
| 
| Oil on wood
| 1880
| 
| Yale University Art Gallery, New Haven, Connecticut
|
|-
! scope="row" | Retrospection (Watercolor)
| 141
| 
| Watercolor on paper
| 
| 
| Philadelphia Museum of Art, Philadelphia, Pennsylvania
|
|-
! scope="row" | Walter MacDowell
| 141A
| 
| Oil
| 
| 
|Private collection
|
|-
! scope="row" | The Crucifixion
| 142
| 
| Oil on canvas
| 1880
| 
| Philadelphia Museum of Art, Philadelphia, Pennsylvania
|
|-
! scope="row" | Sketch for the Crucifixion
| 143
| 
| Oil on canvas
| 1880
| 
| Hirshhorn Museum and Sculpture Garden, Washington, D.C.
|
|-
! scope="row" | J. Laurie Wallace posing
| 143A
| 
| Oil
| 
| 
|Private collection
| Auctioned at Sotheby's NY, December 3, 1987; sold for $160,000.
|-
! scope="row" | Spinning
| 144
| 
| Watercolor on paper
| 1881
| 
| Collection of Mrs. John Randolph Garrett Sr.
|
|-
! scope="row" | Drawing for Spinning
| 144A
|
| Drawing
| 
| 
| 
| 
|-
! scope="row" | Sketch for Spinning
| 145
| 
| Oil on wood
| 
| 
| Pennsylvania Academy of the Fine Arts, Philadelphia, Pennsylvania
|
|-
! scope="row" | Spinning (also called "Homespun")
| 146
| 
| Watercolor on paper
| 1881
| 
| Metropolitan Museum of Art, New York
|
|-
! scope="row" | Sketch for Spinning
| 147
| 
| Oil on wood
| 
| 
| Yale University Art Gallery, New Haven, Connecticut
| Double sided – the reverse side also contains a sketch for Spinning
|-
! scope="row" | The Pathetic Song
| 148
| 
| Oil on canvas
| 1881
| 
| Corcoran Museum of Art, Washington, DC.
|
|-
! scope="row" | Sketch for the Pathetic Song
| 149
| 
| Oil on wood
| 1881
| 
| Hirshhorn Museum and Sculpture Garden, Washington, DC.
|
|-
! scope="row" | The Pathetic Song
| 149A
| 
| Watercolor
| 
| 
| Metropolitan Museum of Art, New York
|
|-
! scope="row" | Rail Shooting
| 150
| 
| Drawing
| 1881
| 
| Yale University Art Gallery, New Haven, Connecticut
| Published in Scribner's Magazine, July 1881
|-
! scope="row" | A Pusher (also known as "Poleman in the Ma'sh)
| 151
| 
| Drawing
| 1881
| 11 × 5⅞
| National Gallery of Art, Washington, D.C.
|
|-
! scope="row" | Drawing for William Rush Carving The Allegorical Figure Of The Schuylkill
| 151A
| 
| Drawing
| 
| 
| Hirshhorn Museum and Sculpture Garden, Washington, D.C.
| 
|-
! scope="row" | Shad-Fishing at Gloucester on the Delaware River (also called "Taking up the Net")
| 152
| 
| Oil on canvas
| 1881
| 
| Philadelphia Museum of Art, Philadelphia, Pennsylvania
|
|-
! scope="row" | Shad-Fishing at Gloucester on the Delaware River (also called "Taking up the Net")
| 153
| 
| Watercolor on paper
| 1881
| 
| Metropolitan Museum of Art, New York
|
|-
! scope="row" | Shad-Fishing at Gloucester on the Delaware River
| 154
| 
| Oil
| 1881
| 
| Ball State University Art Museum, Muncie, Indiana
|
|-
! scope="row" | Mending the Net
| 155
| 
| Oil on canvas
| 1881
| 
| Philadelphia Museum of Art, Philadelphia, Pennsylvania
|
|-
! scope="row" | Drawing for Mending the Net
| 155A
|
| Drawing
| 
| 
| 
| 
|-
! scope="row" | A Fisherman
| 156
| 
| Oil on cardboard
| 
| 
| Pennsylvania Academy of the Fine Arts, Philadelphia, Pennsylvania
|
|-
! scope="row" | The Tree
| 157
| 
| Oil on wood
| 
| 
| 
| Originally double sided with G-157A until the two images were split.Auctioned at Christie's New York, May 21, 2008, Lot 90; sold for $23,750.
|-
! scope="row" | Mending the Net: Study of the Tree
| 157A
|
| Oil on wood
| 
| 
| 
| Originally double sided with G-157 until the two images were split.
|-
! scope="row" | Mending the Net
| 158
| 
| Watercolor on paper
| 1882
| 
| 
| Auctioned at Christie's NY, June 5, 1997; sold for $1,400,000.
|-
! scope="row" | Drawing the Seine
| 159
| 
| Watercolor on paper
| 1882
| 
| Philadelphia Museum of Art, Philadelphia, Pennsylvania
|
|-
! scope="row" | Hauling the Seine
| 160
| 
| Oil on canvas
| 1882
| 
| Princeton University Art Museum, Princeton, New Jersey
|
|-
! scope="row" | "The Meadows, Gloucester, New Jersey"
| 161
| 
| Oil on canvas
| c. 1882
| 
| Philadelphia Museum of Art, Philadelphia, Pennsylvania
|
|-
! scope="row" | "Sketch for The Meadows, Gloucester, New Jersey"
| 162
|
| Oil on wood
| 
| 
| 
| Originally double sided with G-162A until the two images were split.
|-
! scope="row" | Study
| 162A
|
| Oil
| 
| 
| 
| Originally double sided with G-162 until the two images were split.
|-
! scope="row" | In the Country
| 163
| 
| Oil on canvas
| c. 1882
| 10¼ × 14
| Private collection
| Auctioned at Sotheby's NY, November 29, 1990; sold for $30,000.
|-
! scope="row" | Near the Sea (Also known as "Landscape study")
| 164
|
| Oil on canvas
| 
| 
| Collection of Mr. and Mrs. Daniel Dietrich II
| 
|-
! scope="row" | Untitled landscape sketch
| 165
| 
| Oil on wood
| 
| 
| 
| Originally double sided with G-165A until the two images were split.
|-
! scope="row" | Study of a horse
| 165A
|
| Oil
| 
|
| 
| Originally double sided with G-165 until the two images were split.
|-
! scope="row" | Untitled landscape sketch
| 166
| 
| Oil on canvas
| 
| 
| Philadelphia Museum of Art, Philadelphia, Pennsylvania
|
|-
! scope="row" | Delaware River Scene
| 167
| 
| Oil on canvas
| 
| 
| Pennsylvania Academy of the Fine Arts, Philadelphia, Pennsylvania
|
|-
! scope="row" | Untitled landscape sketch
| 168
|
| Oil on canvas
| 
| 
| 
| 
|-
! scope="row" | Untitled landscape sketch
| 169
| 
| Oil on cardboard
| 
| 
| Philadelphia Museum of Art, Philadelphia, Pennsylvania
|
|-
! scope="row" | Untitled landscape sketch
| 170
| 
| Oil on paper
| 
| 
| Pennsylvania Academy of the Fine Arts, Philadelphia, Pennsylvania
|
|-
! scope="row" | Untitled landscape sketch
| 171
|
| Oil on paper
| 
| 
| 
| 
|-
! scope="row" | Untitled landscape sketch
| 172
| 
| Oil on canvas
| 
| 
| Pennsylvania Academy of the Fine Arts, Philadelphia, Pennsylvania
|
|-
! scope="row" | Untitled landscape sketch
| 173
| 
| Oil on canvas
| 
| 
| Collection of Mr. and Mrs. Daniel Dietrich II
|
|-
! scope="row" | Untitled landscape sketch
| 174
|
| Oil on canvas
| 
| 
| University at Buffalo, The State University of New York art gallery, Buffalo, New York
| 
|-
! scope="row" | Untitled landscape sketch
| 175
| 
| Oil on cardboard
| 
| 
| Collection of Mr. and Mrs. Daniel Dietrich II
|
|-
! scope="row" | Untitled landscape sketch
| 176
|
| Oil on canvas
| 
| 
| 
| 
|-
! scope="row" | Untitled landscape sketch
| 177
|
| Oil on cardboard
| 
| 
| 
| 
|-
! scope="row" | The Brinton House
| 177A
| 
| Oil
| 1878
| 
|
| Subject is the William Brinton 1704 House in Birmingham Township, Chester County, Pennsylvania.Painted for Eakins's friend Dr. John H. Brinton (See G-101).
|-
! scope="row" | Study for Old Man in Taking The Count
| 178
| 
| Oil on canvas
| c. 1898
| 13¼ × 10
|
| Auctioned at Christie's New York, May 24, 2007; sold for $78,000.Auctioned at Freeman's Philadelphia, December 6, 2015; sold for $46,875.
|-
! scope="row" | Untitled sketch
| 179
|
| Oil on canvas mounted on cardboard
| 
| 
| 
| 
|-
! scope="row" | Untitled sketch ("Girl in Shade")
| 180
|
| Oil on cardboard
| 
| 
| Joslyn Art Museum, Omaha, Nebraska
| 
|-
! scope="row" | Untitled sketch
| 181
|
| Oil on wood
| 
| 
| 
| 
|-
! scope="row" | Boatman (Study of a Groom)
| 182
| 
| Oil on wood
| c. 1879
| 
| Philadelphia Museum of Art, Philadelphia, Pennsylvania
| Double sided: one side is a study for the left leader horse in "The Fairman Rogers Four-In-Hand." The reverse side is the Study of a Groom.
|-
! scope="row" | Untitled sketch
| 183
| 
| Oil on cardboard
| 
| 
| Collection of Mr. and Mrs. Daniel Dietrich II
|
|-
! scope="row" | Untitled sketch
| 184
| 
| Oil on heavy paper mounted on cardboard
| 
| 
| La Salle University Art Gallery, Philadelphia, Pennsylvania
|
|-
! scope="row" | Study of Three Balls of Wool and a Rosebush
| 185
|
| Oil on canvas
| 
| 
| Joslyn Art Museum, Omaha, Nebraska
| 
|-
! scope="row" | Two Cylinders and a Ball
| 185A
| 
| Oil
| 
| 
| Joslyn Art Museum, Omaha, Nebraska
|
|-
! scope="row" | Untitled sketch
| 186
|
| Oil on heavy paper
| 
| 
| 
| 
|-
! scope="row" | Study of a woman seated
| 187
|
| Oil on canvas mounted on cardboard
| 
| 
| 
| Auctioned at Doyle's NY, November 28, 2007; unsold.
|-
! scope="row" | Street Scene
| 187A
| 
| Oil
| 
| 
| Hirshhorn Museum and Sculpture Garden, Washington, D.C.
|
|-
! scope="row" | The Writing Master
| 188
| 
| oil on canvas
| 1882
| 
| Metropolitan Museum of Art, New York
|
|-
! scope="row" | Sketch for the Writing Master
| 189
| 
| Oil on wood
| 
| 
| Philadelphia Museum of Art, Philadelphia, Pennsylvania
| Double sided – one side is a sketch for "The Writing Master." The other side is Sketch of a Man and Study of Drapery
|-
! scope="row" | The Swimming Hole
| 190
| 
| Oil on canvas
| 1884–1885
| 
| Amon Carter Museum, Fort Worth, Texas
|
|-
! scope="row" | Study for the Swimming Hole
| 191
| 
| Oil on wood
| 1884
| 
| Hirshhorn Museum and Sculpture Garden, Washington, DC.
|
|-
! scope="row" | Sketch of the landscape for the Swimming Hole
| 192
| 
| Oil on wood
| 
| 
| Collection of Mr. I David Orr
|
|-
! scope="row" | Sketches for the Swimming Hole
| 193
| 
| Oil on cardboard
| 
| 
| Collection of Mr. and Mrs. Daniel Dietrich IIBolger, plates 17–18
| Double-sided, both sides are studies for "The Swimming Hole"
|-
! scope="row" | Sketches for the Swimming Hole
| 194
| 
| Oil on cardboard
| 
| 
| Amon Carter Museum, Fort Worth, Texas
| Double-sided, both sides are studies for "The Swimming Hole"
|-
! scope="row" | Study for The Swimming Hole
| 195
| 
| Oil on cardboard
| 
| 
| Collection of Mr. and Mrs. Daniel Dietrich IIBolger, plate 19
| Double-sided, obverse side contains study of the fisherman's hand from "Mending the Net"
|-
! scope="row" | Arcadia
| 196
| 
| Oil on canvas
| 1883
| 
| Metropolitan Museum of Art, New York
|
|-
! scope="row" | Sketch for Arcadia
| 197
| 
| Oil on wood
| 
| 
| Pennsylvania Academy of the Fine Arts, Philadelphia, PennsylvaniaFoster, #251
|
|-
! scope="row" | Youth Playing Pipes
| 198
| 
| Oil on wood
| 
| 
| Carnegie Museum of Art, Pittsburgh, Pennsylvania
| J. Laurie Wallace posed as the model.
|-
! scope="row" | Boy Reclining
| 199
| 
| Oil on wood
| 
| 
| Hirshhorn Museum and Sculpture Garden, Washington, DC.
| Originally double sided with G-199A until the two images were split.
|-
! scope="row" | Study of a Horse
| 199A
| 
| Drawing
| 
| 
|
| Originally double sided with G-199 until the two images were split.Deaccessioned from Hirshhorn Museum and Sculpture Garden.Auctioned at Sotheby's NY (in a lot with G-137, G-137A & G-201A), May 21, 2009; the lot sold for $119,500.
|-
! scope="row" | An Arcadian
| 200
| 
| Oil on canvas
| c. 1883
| 
| 
| 
|-
! scope="row" | Study for An Arcadian
| 201
| 
| Oil on wood
| 
| 
| 
| Originally double sided with G-201A until the two images were split.Deassessioned from Hirshhorn Museum and Sculpture Garden.Auctioned at Christie's NY, March 23, 2016, Lot 56.
|-
! scope="row" | Studies of a horse
| 201A
| 
| Drawing
| 
| 
| 
| Originally double sided with G-201 until the two images were split.Deaccessioned from Hirshhorn Museum and Sculpture Garden.Auctioned at Sotheby's NY (in a lot with G-137, G-137A & G-199A), 2009; the lot sold for $119,500.
|-
! scope="row" | Weda Cook and Statue
| 201B
|
| Oil
| 
| 
| 
| See G-267A for a related study.
|-
! scope="row" | A Woman's Back: Study
| 202
| 
| Oil on wood
| 1879
| 
| Collection of Mr. and Mrs. Daniel Dietrich IIGoodrich, 1982, volume I, page 177
|
|-
! scope="row" | Female Nude
| 203
| 
| Oil on canvas
| Probably early 1880s
| 
| Hirshhorn Museum and Sculpture Garden, Washington, D.C.
| 
|-
! scope="row" | Female Nude
| 204
| 
| Oil on canvas
| Probably early 1880s
| 
| Nelson-Atkins Museum of Art, Kansas City, Missouri
|
|-
! scope="row" | Female Nude
| 205
| 
| Watercolor on paper
| 
| 
| Philadelphia Museum of Art, Philadelphia, Pennsylvania
|
|-
! scope="row" | Study for female nude
| 205A
| 
| Oil
| 
| 
|
| Deaccessioned from the Hirshhorn Museum and Sculpture Garden.Auctioned at Sotheby's NY, September 29, 2010; sold for $50,000.
|-
! scope="row" | J. Laurie Wallace
| 206
| 
| Oil on canvas
| c. 1883
|  
| Joslyn Art Museum, Omaha, Nebraska
|
|-
! scope="row" | Drawing for J. Laurie Wallace
| 206A
|
| Drawing
| 
| 
| Joslyn Art Museum, Omaha, Nebraska
| 
|-
! scope="row" | Professionals at Rehearsal
| 207
| 
| Oil on canvas
| c. 1883
| 
| Philadelphia Museum of Art, Philadelphia, Pennsylvania
|
|-
|Perspective Study Of Boy Viewing an Object
|207A
| 
| 
| 
| 
| Hirshhorn Museum and Sculpture Garden, Washington, D.C.
|
|-
|Perspective drawing of a table
|207B
| 
| 
| 
| 
| Hirshhorn Museum and Sculpture Garden, Washington, D.C.
|
|-
|Perspective drawing of two tables
|207C
| 
| 
| 
| 
| 
|
|-
! scope="row" | In the Studio
| 208
| 
| Oil on canvas
| 1884
| 
| The Hyde Collection, Glens Falls, New York
|
|-
! scope="row" | In the Studio
| 209
| 
| Watercolor on paper
| 
| 
| Philadelphia Museum of Art, Philadelphia, Pennsylvania
| Unfinished
|-
! scope="row" | A.B. Frost
| 210
| 
| Oil on canvas
| c. 1884
| 
| Philadelphia Museum of Art, Philadelphia, Pennsylvania
|
|-
! scope="row" | Study for A.B. Frost
| 210A
| 
| Oil on cardboard
| 
| 
| Detroit Institute of Arts, Detroit, Michigan
|
|-
! scope="row" | The Veteran
| 211
| 
| Oil on canvas
| c. 1886
| 
| Yale University Art Gallery, New Haven, Connecticut
|
|-
! scope="row" | Mrs. William Shaw Ward
| 212
| 
| Oil on canvas
| 
| 
| 
| Auctioned at Sothebys NY, December 2, 2010; sold for $242,500.
|-
! scope="row" | The Artist's Wife and His Setter Dog
| 213
| 
| Oil on canvas
| 1885
| 
| Metropolitan Museum of Art, New York
|
|-
! scope="row" | Professor George F. Barker
| 214
| Barker's portrait as it appeared originally.
| Oil on canvas
| 1886
| 
| Mitchell Museum at Cedarhurst, Mount Vernon, Illinois
| Originally 3/4-length and 60×40 inches, cut down to head-and-bust and 24×20 inches.
|-
! scope="row" | Sketch for Professor George F. Barker
| 215
| 
| Oil on cardboard
| 1886
| 
| Philadelphia Museum of Art, Philadelphia, Pennsylvania
| Doubled sided – one side is a sketch for Professor George F. Barker. The other side depicts seated figures.
|-
! scope="row" | Professor William D. Marks
| 216
| 
| Oil on canvas
| 1886
| 
| Washington University Gallery of Art, St. Louis, Missouri
|
|-
! scope="row" | Professor William D. Marks (unfinished)
| 217
| 
| Oil on canvas
| c. 1886
| 76 × 54
| Iris & B. Gerald Cantor Center for Visual Arts, Stanford, California
|
|-
! scope="row" | Miss Sophie Brooks
| 217A
|
| Oil
| 
| 
| 
| 
|-
! scope="row" | Frank McDowell
| 218
| 
| Oil on canvas
| c. 1886
| 
| Virginia Museum of Fine Arts,Richmond, Virginia
| Auctioned at Christie's NY, December 9, 1983; sold for $80,000.
|-
! scope="row" | Frank MacDowell (unfinished)
| 219
| 
| Oil on canvas
| 
| 
| Hirshhorn Museum and Sculpture Garden, Washington, D.C.
|
|-
! scope="row" | Portrait of Walt Whitman
| 220
| 
| Oil on canvas
| 1887–1888
| 
| Pennsylvania Academy of the Fine Arts, Philadelphia, Pennsylvania
|
|-
! scope="row" | Sketch for Walt Whitman
| 221
| 
| Oil on wood
| Probably 1887
| 
| Museum of Fine Arts, Boston, Boston, Massachusetts
|
|-
! scope="row" | Mrs. Letitia Wilson Jordan
| 222
| 
| Oil on canvas
| 1888
| 
| Brooklyn Museum of Art, New York City
|
|-
! scope="row" | Sketch for Mrs. Letitia Wilson Jordan Bacon
| 223
| 
| Oil on cardboard
| 
| 
| Philadelphia Museum of Art, Philadelphia, Pennsylvania
|
|-
! scope="row" | Cowboys in the Badlands
| 224
| 
| Oil on canvas
| 1888
| 
| Anschutz collection, Denver, Colorado
| Auctioned at Christie's NY, May 22, 2003; sold for $5,383,500.Set a record for an Eakins painting at auction.
|-
! scope="row" | Sketches for Cowboys in the Badlands
| 225
| 
| Oil on cardboard
| 
| 
| Albright-Knox Art Gallery, Buffalo, New York
| Originally part of the same work with G-225A and G-225B.
|-
! scope="row" | Sketch of a saddle
| 225A
| 
| Oil on canvas on cardboard
| 1887
| 
| Philadelphia Museum of Art, Philadelphia, Pennsylvania
| Originally part of the same work with G-225 and G-225B.
|-
! scope="row" | Study of a stirrup
| 225B
| 
| 
| 
| 
| 
| Originally part of the same work with G-225 and G-225A.
|-
! scope="row" | Sketch for Cowboys in the Badlands
| 226
| 
| Oil on canvas
| 
| 
| Denver Art Museum, Denver, Colorado
| Deaccessioned by the Philadelphia Museum of Art, April 2008, to fund the co-purchase (with PAFA) of The Gross Clinic.
|-
! scope="row" | The Bad Lands
| 227
| 
| Oil on canvas mounted on cardboard
| 
| 
| Philadelphia Museum of Art, Philadelphia, Pennsylvania
|
|-
! scope="row" | Study for Cowboys in the Badlands
| 227A
| 
| Oil on canvas
| 
| 10⅜ × 13½
| 
| Auctioned at Sothebys NY, October 17, 1980; sold for $8,000.
|-
! scope="row" | Landscape sketch for Cowboys in the Badlands
| 228
| 
| Oil on canvas mounted on cardboard
| 
| 
| Philadelphia Museum of Art, Philadelphia, Pennsylvania
| Originally double sided with G-228A.
|-
! scope="row" | Landscape sketch for Cowboys in the Badlands
| 228A
| 
| Oil on canvas mounted on cardboard
| 
| 
| Philadelphia Museum of Art, Philadelphia, Pennsylvania
| Originally double sided with G-228.
|-
! scope="row" | Cowboy Riding
| 229
| 
| Oil on canvas mounted on cardboard
| 
| 
| Denver Art Museum, Denver, Colorado
| Deaccessioned from the Philadelphia Museum of Art, April 2008, to fund the co-purchase (with PAFA) of The Gross Clinic.
|-
! scope="row" | Cowboy (sketches)
| 230
| 
| Oil on canvas mounted on cardboard
| 
| 
| 
| Edward Boulton posed as the model for the cowboy.
|-
! scope="row" | Cowboy Riding
| 230A
| 
| Oil on canvas
| 
| 10¼ × 14¼
| 
| Auctioned at Freeman's Philadelphia, June 22, 2003; sold for $12,000.
|-
! scope="row" | Cowboy (sketch)
| 231
|
| Oil on canvas mounted on cardboard
| 
| 
| 
| 
|-
! scope="row" | Edward W. Boulton
| 232
| 
| 
| c. 1888
| 
| 
| Destroyed by vandalism – "The portrait of [Edward W.] Boulton by Eakins was lent to the University Club for an exhibit, and a waiter ran amuck and slashed it up."
|-
! scope="row" | Douglass M. Hall
| 233
| 
| Oil on canvas
| c. 1888
| 
| Philadelphia Museum of Art, Philadelphia, Pennsylvania
| Used as cover image for the album "Kapitulation" by the German indie rock band Tocotronic.
|-
! scope="row" | Girl in a Big Hat (Portrait of Lillian Hammitt)
| 234
| 
| Oil on canvas
| c. 1888
| 
| Hirshhorn Museum and Sculpture Garden, Washington, D.C.
| Hammitt paraded through the streets in a bathing suit and claimed to be Mrs. Thomas Eakins. She was committed to a mental hospital.
|-
! scope="row" | The Agnew Clinic
| 235
| 
| Oil on canvas
| 1889
| 
| University of Pennsylvania School of Medicine, Philadelphia, Pennsylvania
|
|-
! scope="row" | Drawing of David Hayes Agnew
| 235A
| 
| Ink and pencil on paper
| c. 1889
| 9 9/16 x 6 1/16
| Philadelphia Museum of Art
|
|-
! scope="row" | Sketch for the Agnew Clinic
| 236
| 
| Oil on canvas mounted on cardboard
| 
| 
|Virginia Museum of Fine Arts,Richmond, Virginia
|
|-
! scope="row" | Study of Dr. D. Hayes Agnew
| 237
| 
| Oil on canvas
| 1889
| 
| Yale University Art Gallery, New Haven, Connecticut
|
|-
! scope="row" | Samuel Murray
| 238
| 
| Oil on canvas
| 1889
| 
| Mitchell Museum at Cedarhurst, Mount Vernon, Illinois
|
|-
! scope="row" | Dr. Horatio C. Wood
| 239
| 
| Oil on canvas
| c. 1889
| 
| Detroit Institute of Arts, Detroit, Michigan
|
|-
! scope="row" | Professor George W. Fetter
| 240
| 
| Oil on canvas
| 1890
| 
| Collection of the School District of Philadelphia, Philadelphia, Pennsylvania
|Rediscovered in 2004 by janitors in the boiler room of a Philadelphia school. Currently in an undisclosed location.
|-
! scope="row" | Drawing for Professor George W. Fetter
| 241
|
| Black ink on white tile
| 
| 
| 
| 
|-
! scope="row" | Portrait of Talcott Williams
| 242
| 
| Oil on canvas
| c. 1890
| 
| National Portrait Gallery, Washington, D.C.
|
|-
! scope="row" | The Bohemian: Portrait of Franklin Louis Schenk
| 243
| 
| Oil on canvas
| c. 1890
| 
| Philadelphia Museum of Art, Philadelphia, Pennsylvania
|
|-
! scope="row" | F.L. Schenk
| 244
| 
| Oil on canvas
| c. 1890
| 
| Delaware Art Museum, Wilmington, Delaware
|
|-
! scope="row" | F.L. Schenk
| 245
|
| Oil on cardboard
| c. 1890
| 
| Private collection
| 
|-
! scope="row" | The Father of F.L. Schenk
| 246
| 
| Oil on canvas
| c. 1890
| 
| Collection of Nelson C. White
|
|-
! scope="row" | Head of a Cowboy
| 247
| 
| Oil on canvas
| c. 1890
| 
| Mead Art Museum, Amherst, Massachusetts
|
|-
! scope="row" | Home Ranch
| 248
| 
| Oil on canvas
| c. 1890
| 
| Philadelphia Museum of Art, Philadelphia, Pennsylvania
|
|-
! scope="row" | Cowboy Singing
| 249
| 
| Watercolor on paper
| c. 1890
| 
| Metropolitan Museum of Art, New York
|
|-
! scope="row" | Cowboy Singing
| 250
| 
| Oil on canvas
| c. 1890
| 
| Jointly owned by Anschutz collection and Denver Art Museum, Denver, Colorado
| Deaccessioned from the Philadelphia Museum of Art, April 2008, to fund (with PAFA) the co-purchase of "The Gross Clinic."
|-
! scope="row" | Thomas B. Harned
| 251
| 
| Oil on canvas
| c. 1890
| 24 x 20
| Collection of Dr. and Mrs. Herbert S. Harned, Jr. On long-term loan to the Ackland Art Museum, Chapel Hill, North Carolina
|
|-
! scope="row" | Dr. Joseph Leidy II (also known as "Portrait of Man with Red Necktie")
| 252
| 
| Oil on canvas
| 1890
| 50 x 36
| 
|Deassessioned from Newark Museum, Newark, New Jersey.Auctioned at Sotheby's New York, 19 May 2021. Sold for $362,800.
|-
! scope="row" | Dr. Joseph Leidy II (unfinished)
| 253
|
| Oil on canvas
| 
| 
| 
| 
|-
! scope="row" | William H. Macdowell
| 254
| 
| Oil on canvas
| c. 1890
| 
| Yale University Art Gallery, New Haven, Connecticut
|
|-
! scope="row" | Phidias Studying for the Frieze of the Parthenon
| 255
| 
| Oil on wood
| c. 1890
| 
| Collection of the Eakins Press Foundation
| Originally double sided with G-255A until the two images were split.
|-
! scope="row" | Two Nude Youths on Prancing Horses
| 255A
| 
| Oil on wood
| c. 1890
| 
| 
| Originally double sided with G-255 until the two images were split.
|-
! scope="row" | The Red Shawl
| 256
| 
| Oil on canvas
| c. 1890
| 
| Philadelphia Museum of Art, Philadelphia, Pennsylvania
|
|-
! scope="row" | Francis J. Ziegler (also known as "The Critic")
| 257
| 
| Oil on canvas
| c. 1890
| 
| Fogg Art Museum, Cambridge, Massachusetts
|
|-
! scope="row" | The Art Student: Portrait of James Wright
| 258
| 
| Oil on canvas
| c. 1890
| 
| Crystal Bridges Museum of American Art, Bentonville, Arkansas
| Ex collection: Maloogian Collection, on loan to Detroit Institute of Arts, Detroit, Michigan
|-
! scope="row" | The Black Fan
| 259
| 
| Oil on canvas
| c. 1891
| 
| Philadelphia Museum of Art, Philadelphia, Pennsylvania
|
|-
! scope="row" | William H. Macdowell
| 260
| 
| Oil on canvas
| c. 1891
| 
| Taubman Museum of Art, Roanoke, Virginia
|
|-
! scope="row" | William H. Macdowell (study)
| 261
| 
| Oil on canvas
| c. 1891
| 
| Randolph-Macon Woman's College Art Gallery, Lynchburg, Virginia
|
|-
! scope="row" | Portrait of William H. MacDowell
| 262
| 
| Paper on a stretcher
| 
| 
| Baltimore Museum of Art, Baltimore, Maryland
| Unfinished
|-
! scope="row" | Study for William H. MacDowell
| 262A
| 
| Oil on canvas
| 
| 
| Hirshhorn Museum and Sculpture Garden, Washington, D.C.
|
|-
! scope="row" | Miss Amelia Van Buren
| 263
| 
| Oil on canvas
| c. 1891
| 
| The Phillips Collection, Washington, D.C.
|
|-
! scope="row" | Professor Henry A. Rowland
| 264
| 
| Oil on canvas
| 1897
| 
| Addison Gallery of American Art, Andover, Massachusetts
|
|-
! scope="row" | Sketch for Professor Henry A. Rowland
| 265
| 
| Oil on canvas
| 
| 
| Addison Gallery of American Art, Andover, Massachusetts
|
|-
! scope="row" | The Concert Singer
| 266
| 
| Oil on canvas
| 1890–1892
| 
| Philadelphia Museum of Art, Philadelphia, Pennsylvania
|
|-
! scope="row" | Sketch for the Concert Singer
| 267
| 
| Oil on canvas mounted on wood
| 
| 
| Philadelphia Museum of Art, Philadelphia, Pennsylvania
|
|-
! scope="row" | Study for Weda Cook and Statue
| 267A
| 
| Oil on canvas
| 
| 
| Blanton Museum of Art, Austin, Texas
| Also known as "The Opera Singer." On the reverse is "Woman on balcony waving white handkerchief."
|-
! scope="row" | Joshua Ballinger Lippincott
| 268
| 
| Oil on canvas
| 1892
| 
| Philadelphia Museum of Art, Philadelphia, Pennsylvania
|
|-
! scope="row" | Study for Joshua Ballinger Lippincott
| 268A
| 
| Oil
| 1892
| 
| Hirshhorn Museum and Sculpture Garden, Washington, D.C.
|
|-
! scope="row" | Miss Blanche Hurlburt
| 269
| 
| Oil on canvas
| c. 1892
| 
| Philadelphia Museum of Art, Philadelphia, Pennsylvania
|
|-
! scope="row" | Dr. Jacob M. Da Costa
| 270
| 
| Oil on canvas
| 1893
| 
| Pennsylvania HospitalKirkpatrick, 384
|
|-
! scope="row" | Jacob M. Da Costa
| 270A
|
| Oil on canvas
| 
| 
|
| Destroyed by Thomas Eakins after DaCosta rejected it.
|-
! scope="row" | Sketch for Dr. Jacob M. Da Costa
| 271
| 
| Oil on canvas mounted on cardboard
| 
| 
| Philadelphia Museum of Art, Philadelphia, Pennsylvania
|
|-
! scope="row" | Girl with Puff Sleeves
| 272
| 
| Oil on canvas
| 
| 
| 
| Deaccessioned from the Hirshhorn Museum and Sculpture Garden.Auctioned at Sotheby's NY, September 29, 2010; sold for $18,750.
|-
! scope="row" | Frank Hamilton Cushing
| 273
| 
| Oil on canvas
| Late 1894 or 1895
| 
| Gilcrease Museum, Tulsa, Oklahoma
|
|-
! scope="row" | Study for Frank Hamilton Cushing
| 274
| 
| Oil on canvas
| 
| 
| Hirshhorn Museum and Sculpture Garden, Washington, D.C.
|
|-
! scope="row" | Mrs. Frank Hamilton Cushing
| 275
| 
| Oil on canvas
| c. 1894 or 1895
| 
| Philadelphia Museum of Art, Philadelphia, Pennsylvania
|
|-
! scope="row" | Study of James MacAlister (also known as "Man in the Red Necktie")
| 276
| 
| Oil on canvas mounted on cardboard
| ca. 1895
| 
| Metropolitan Museum of Art, New York
| Originally double sided with G-276A until the two images were split.
|-
! scope="row" | Study for William L. MacLean
| 276A
| 
| Oil on canvas mounted on cardboard
| ca. 1895
| 
| 
| Originally double sided with G-276 until the two images were split.
|-
! scope="row" | Weda Cook
| 277
| 
| Oil on canvas
| c. 1895
| 
| Columbus Museum of Art, Columbus, Ohio
|
|-
! scope="row" | The Pianist (Stanley Addicks)
| 278
| 
| Oil on canvas
| c. 1895
| 
| Indianapolis Museum of Art, Indianapolis, Indiana
|
|-
! scope="row" | Katherine Maud Cook
| 279
| 
| Oil on canvas
| 1895
| 
| Yale University Art Gallery, New Haven, Connecticut
|
|-
! scope="row" | Riter Fitzgerald
| 280
| 
| Oil on canvas
| 1895
| 
| Art Institute of Chicago, Chicago, Illinois
|
|-
! scope="row" | Sketch for Riter Fitzgerald
| 281
| 
| Oil on canvas mounted on cardboard
| 
| 
| The Huntington Library, San Marino, California
|
|-
! scope="row" | Sketch for Riter Fitzgerald
| 282
| 
| Oil on canvas
| 
| 
| 
| 
|-
! scope="row" | Study for Mrs. Hubbard
| 283
| 
| Oil on canvas mounted on cardboard
| c. 1895
| 
| Sewell C. Biggs Museum of American Art, Dover, Delaware
| Study for now-destroyed portrait of Mrs. Hubbard.Auctioned at Sotheby's NY, March 11, 1999; sold for $34,500.
|-
! scope="row" | John McLure Hamilton
| 284
| 
| Oil on canvas
| 1895
| 
| Wadsworth Atheneum, Hartford, Connecticut
|
|-
! scope="row" | Sketch for John McLure Hamilton
| 285
| 
| Oil on canvas mounted on cardboard
| 
| 14⅝ × 10⅝
| Georgia Museum of Art, Athens, Georgia
|
|-
! scope="row" | Mrs. Charles L. Leonard
| 286
| 
| Oil on cardboard
| 1895
| 
| Thomas Colville Fine Art
| Deaccessioned from Hirshhorn Museum and Sculpture Garden.Auctioned at Christie's NY, March 3, 2011; sold for $25,000.
|-
! scope="row" | Miss Gertrude Murray
| 287
| 
| Oil on canvas
| 1895
| 
| Dallas Museum of Art, Dallas, Texas
|
|-
! scope="row" | Charles Linford
| 288
| 
| Oil on canvas
| c. 1895
| 
| 
| Ex collection: IBM.Auctioned at Sotheby's NY, Mat 25, 1995; sold for $80,000.
|-
! scope="row" | Captain Joseph Lapsley Wilson
| 289
| 
| Oil on canvas
| c. 1895
| 30 × 22
| Collection of the First Troop Philadelphia City Cavalry
|
|-
! scope="row" | Sketch for Captain Joseph Lapsley Wilson
| 290
|
| Oil on canvas mounted on cardboard
| c. 1895
| 7¾ × 5¼
| 
| Auctioned at Christie's NY, June 3, 1983; sold for $9000.Ex collection: Gulf States Paper Corporation, Tuscaloosa, Alabama (1983-2013).Auctioned at Christie's New York, September 25, 2013, Lot 196, Unsold.
|-
! scope="row" | The Cello Player
| 291
| 
| Oil on canvas
| 1896
| 
| Private collection
| Deaccessioned from the Pennsylvania Academy of the Fine Arts, 2007, to fund the co-purchase (with PMA) of "The Gross Clinic."
|-
! scope="row" | Sketch for the Cello Player
| 292
| 
| Oil on canvas
| 1896
| 
| Heckscher Museum of Art, Huntington, New York
|
|-
! scope="row" | Mrs. James Mapes Dodge
| 293
| 
| Oil on canvas
| 1896
| 
| Philadelphia Museum of Art, Philadelphia, Pennsylvania
|
|-
! scope="row" | Harrison S. Morris
| 294
| 
| Oil on canvas
| 1896
| 
| Pennsylvania Academy of the Fine Arts, Philadelphia, Pennsylvania
|
|-
! scope="row" | Sketch for Harrison S. Morris
| 295
| 
| Oil on canvas mounted on cardboard
| 
| 
|Newark Museum, Newark, New Jersey
|
|-
! scope="row" | Professor William Woolsey Johnson
| 295A
| 
| Oil on canvas
| c. 1896
| 
| M. H. de Young Memorial Museum, San Francisco, California
|
|-
! scope="row" | Dr. Charles Lester Leonard
| 296
| 
| Oil on canvas
| 1897
|  
| Collection of the University of Pennsylvania School of Medicine, Philadelphia, Pennsylvania
|
|-
! scope="row" | Jennie Dean Kershaw (Mrs. Samuel Murray)
| 297
| 
| Oil on canvas
| c. 1897
| 
| Sheldon Museum of Art, Lincoln, Nebraska
|
|-
! scope="row" | Mrs. Samuel Murray (unfinished)
| 298
| 
| Oil on canvas
| 
| 
| Baltimore Museum of Art, Baltimore, Maryland
|
|-
! scope="row" | Miss Lucy Lewis
| 299
| 
| Oil on canvas
| c. 1897
| 
| Philadelphia Museum of Art, Philadelphia, Pennsylvania
|
|-
! scope="row" | Miss Anna Lewis
| 300
| 
| Oil on canvas
| c. 1898
| 
| Hirshhorn Museum and Sculpture Garden, Washington, D.C.
|
|-
! scope="row" | William H. MacDowell with a Hat
| 301
| 
| Oil on canvas
| c. 1898
| 
| Taubman Museum of Art, Roanoke, Virginia
|
|-
! scope="row" | General E. Burd Grubb
| 302
| 
| Oil on canvas
| Probably 1898
| 
| Yale University Art Gallery, New Haven, Connecticut
|
|-
! scope="row" | Taking the Count
| 303
| 
| Oil on canvas
| 1898
| 
| Yale University Art Gallery, New Haven, Connecticut
|
|-
! scope="row" | Sketch for Taking the Count
| 304
| 
| Oil on canvas mounted on cardboard
| 1898
| 
| Yale University Art Gallery, New Haven, Connecticut
|
|-
! scope="row" | Sketch for Taking the Count
| 305
| 
| Oil on canvas
| 
| 
| Hirshhorn Museum and Sculpture Garden, Washington, D.C.
|
|-
! scope="row" | The Referee, H. Walter Schlichter
| 306
| 
| Oil on canvas
| 1898
| 
| Hirshhorn Museum and Sculpture Garden, Washington, D.C.
|
|-
! scope="row" | Maybelle
| 307
| 
| Oil on canvas
| 1898
| 
| Frye Art Museum, Seattle, Washington
|
|-
! scope="row" | Sketch for Maybelle
| 308
| 
| Oil on canvas mounted on cardboard
| 
| 
| 
| 
|-
! scope="row" | John N. Fort
| 309
| 
| Oil on canvas
| 1898
| 
| Williams College Museum of Art, Williamstown, Massachusetts
|
|-
! scope="row" | Salutat
| 310
| 
| Oil on canvas
| 1898
| 
| Addison Gallery of American Art, Phillips Academy
|
|-
! scope="row" | Study for Salutat
| 311
| 
| Oil on canvas
| 1898
| 
| Carnegie Museum of Art, Pittsburgh, Pennsylvania
|
|-
! scope="row" | Between Rounds
| 312
| 
| Oil on canvas
| 1898–1899
| 
| Philadelphia Museum of Art, Philadelphia, Pennsylvania
|
|-
! scope="row" | Sketch for Between Rounds
| 313
| 
| Oil on cardboard
| 
|
| Hirshhorn Museum and Sculpture Garden, Washington, D.C.
| Double sided – one side is a study for "Between Rounds;" the other side is a landscape sketch.
|-
! scope="row" | Billy Smith (sketch)
| 314
| 
| Oil on canvas
| c. 1898
| 
| Philadelphia Museum of Art, Philadelphia, Pennsylvania
|
|-
! scope="row" | Billy Smith (study)
| 315
| 
| Oil on canvas
| 1898
| 
| Wichita Art Museum, Wichita, Kansas
|
|-
! scope="row" | The Timer
| 316
| 
| Oil on canvas
| 1898
| 
| New Britain Museum of American Art, New Britain, Connecticut
|
|-
! scope="row" | Wrestlers
| 317
| 
| Oil on canvas
| 1899
| 
| Los Angeles County Museum of Art, Los Angeles County, California
|
|-
! scope="row" | Study for Wrestlers
| 318
| 
| Oil on canvas
| 
| 
| Los Angeles County Museum of Art, Los Angeles County, California
|
|-
! scope="row" | Wrestlers (unfinished)
| 319
| 
| Oil on canvas
| 1899
| 
| Philadelphia Museum of Art, Philadelphia, Pennsylvania
|
|-
! scope="row" | The Fairman Rogers Four-in-Hand (black & white)
| 320
| 
| Oil on canvas
| 1899
| 
| St. Louis Art Museum, St. Louis, Missouri
| Black & white version of the 1879–80 original. Painted to be photographed as an illustration for Fairman Rogers, A Manual of Coaching (Philadelphia, 1900).
|-
! scope="row" | T. Ellwood Potts
| 321
|
|
| 1890–1900
| 
| 
| 
|-
! scope="row" | Mrs. T Ellwood Potts
| 322
|
| 
| c. 1890–1900
| 
| 
| 
|-
! scope="row" | Addie: A Woman in Black (Portrait of Miss Mary Adeline Williams)
| 323
| 
| Oil on canvas
| c. 1899
| 
| Art Institute of Chicago, Chicago, Illinois
| In Eakins Revealed (pp. 369–371), author Henry Adams claims that Mary Adeline "Addie" Williams, an Eakins family friend, was the nude model for G-451 William Rush and his Model, and related studies G-445, G-446, G-447, G-452, G-453 and G-454.
|-
! scope="row" | Benjamin Eakins
| 324
| 
| Oil on canvas
| c. 1899
| 
| Philadelphia Museum of Art, Philadelphia, Pennsylvania
|
|-
! scope="row" | Mrs. Thomas Eakins
| 325
| 
| Oil on canvas
| c. 1899
| 
| Hirshhorn Museum and Sculpture Garden, Washington, D.C.
|
|-
! scope="row" | Mrs. William H. Green
| 326
| 
| Oil on canvas
| 1899
| 
| Driscoll Babcock Galleries
| Deaccessioned from the Hirshhorn Museum and Sculpture Garden.Auctioned at Sotheby's NY, September 29, 2010; sold for $31,250.
|-
! scope="row" | The Dean's Roll Call
| 327
| 
| Oil on canvas
| 1899
| 
| Museum of Fine Arts, Boston, Boston, Massachusetts
|
|-
! scope="row" | Louis Husson
| 328
| 
| Oil on canvas
| 1899
| 
| National Gallery of Art, Washington, D.C.
|
|-
! scope="row" | David Wilson Jordan
| 329
| 
| Oil on canvas
| 1899
| 
| The Huntington Library, San Marino, California
|
|-
! scope="row" | Study for David Wilson Jordan
| 329A
|
| Oil
| 
| 
| 
| 
|-
! scope="row" | William Merritt Chase
| 330
| 
| Oil on canvas
| c. 1899
| 
| Hirshhorn Museum and Sculpture Garden, Washington, DC.
|
|-
! scope="row" | The Thinker: Portrait of Louis N. Kenton
| 331
| 
| Oil on canvas
| 1900
| 
| Metropolitan Museum of Art, New York
|
|-
! scope="row" | Sketch for The Thinker
| 332
| 
| Oil on cardboard mounted on wood
| 
| 
| Farnsworth Art Museum, Rockland, Maine
| Originally double sided with G-365A until the two images were split.
|-
! scope="row" | Addie (also known as "Portrait of Mary Adeline Williams")
| 333
| 
| Oil on canvas
| 1900
| 
| Philadelphia Museum of Art, Philadelphia, Pennsylvania
|
|-
! scope="row" | Mrs. Mary Arthur
| 334
| 
| Oil on canvas
| 1900
| 
| Metropolitan Museum of Art, New York
|
|-
! scope="row" | Robert M. Lindsay
| 335
| 
| Oil on canvas
| 1900
| 
| Detroit Institute of Arts, Detroit, Michigan
|
|-
! scope="row" | Sketch for Robert M. Lindsay
| 336
| 
| Oil on wood
| 
| 
| Detroit Institute of Arts, Detroit, Michigan
|
|-
! scope="row" | Frank Jay St. John
| 337
| 
| Oil on canvas
| 1900
| 
| M. H. de Young Memorial Museum, San Francisco, California
|
|-
! scope="row" | Antiquated Music: Portrait of Sarah Sagehorn Frishmuth
| 338
| 
| Oil on canvas
| 1900
| 
| Philadelphia Museum of Art, Philadelphia, Pennsylvania
|
|-
! scope="row" | Mrs. Joseph H. Drexel
| 339
| 
| Oil on canvas unstretched
| 1900
| 
| 
|Deaccessioned from the Hirshhorn Museum and Sculpture Garden.Auctioned at Christie's NY, May 18, 2011; sold for $68,500.
|-
! scope="row" | Sketch for Mrs. Joseph H. Drexel
| 340
|
| Oil on cardboard
| c. 1900
| 
| 
| 
|-
! scope="row" | Dr. Daniel Garrison Brinton
| 340A
| 
| Oil
| 
| 
| Collection of the American Philosophical Society.
|
|-
! scope="row" | Clara J. Mather
| 341
| 
| Oil on canvas
| c. 1900
| 
| Musée d'Orsay, Paris, France
|
|-
! scope="row" | A Woman in Black (Portrait of Clara J. Mather)
| 342
|
| Oil on wood
| 
| 
| 
| 
|-
! scope="row" | Elizabeth R. Coffin
| 343
| 
| Oil on canvas
| c. 1900
| 
| Coffin School collection, Egan Institute of Maritime Studies, Nantucket, Massachusetts
|
|-
! scope="row" | Dr. Edward J. Nolan
| 344
| 
| Oil on canvas
| c. 1900
| 
| Philadelphia Museum of Art, Philadelphia, Pennsylvania
|
|-
! scope="row" | Henry O. Tanner
| 345
| 
| Oil on canvas
| c. 1900
| 
| The Hyde Collection, Glens Falls, New York
|
|-
! scope="row" | Honorable John A. Thorton
| 346
| 
| Oil on canvas
| 
| 
| Schwarz Gallery, Philadelphia, Pennsylvania
|
|-
! scope="row" | Monsignor James P. Turner
| 347
| 
| Oil on canvas
| c. 1900
| 
| 
| Eakins later painted a full-length portrait of Monsignor Turner (G-438); sketch (G-439).Deassessioned from St. Charles Borromeo Seminary, Wynnewood, Pennsylvania2014 put up for sale, see Paintings of noted artists, including Eakins, to be sold by seminaryAuctioned at Christie's NY, November 19, 2015; sold for $221,000.
|-
! scope="row" | Portrait of Leslie W. Miller
| 348
| 
| Oil on canvas
| 1901
| 
| Philadelphia Museum of Art, Philadelphia, Pennsylvania
|
|-
! scope="row" | Sketch for Professor Leslie W. Miller
| 349
| 
| Oil on cardboard
| c. 1892–1894
| 
| Philadelphia Museum of Art, Philadelphia, Pennsylvania
| Double sided: one side depicts Leslie W. Miller. The reverse depicts Thomas Eakins' dog, Harry.
|-
! scope="row" | Signature for 'Leslie W. Miller'
| 349A
| 
| Drawing
| 
| 
| Hirshhorn Museum and Sculpture Garden, Washington, D.C.
|
|-
! scope="row" | Mrs. Leslie W. Miller
| 350
|
| Oil on canvas
| 1901
| 
| 
| 
|-
! scope="row" | Mrs. Elizabeth Duane Gillespie
| 351
| 
| Oil on canvas
| 1901
| 
| Collection of the Philadelphia Museum of Art, gift of the Women's Committee
|
|-
! scope="row" | Sketch for Mrs. Elizabeth Duane Gillespie
| 352
| 
| Oil on canvas
| 
| 
| Hirshhorn Museum and Sculpture Garden, Washington, D.C.
|
|-
! scope="row" | George Morris
| 353
|
| Oil on canvas
| 1901
| 
| 
| 
|-
! scope="row" | Reverend Philip R. McDevitt
| 354
| 
| Oil on canvas
| 1901
| 
| Snite Museum of Art, Notre Dame, Indiana
|
|-
! scope="row" | Charles F. Haseltine
| 355
| 
| Oil on canvas
| c. 1901
| 
| Montclair Art Museum, Montclair, New Jersey
|
|-
! scope="row" | Elbridge Ayer Burbank
| 356
|
| 
| c. 1901
| 
| 
| 
|-
! scope="row" | Alfred F. Watch
| 357
|
| 
| c. 1901
| 
| 
| 
|-
! scope="row" | Self-Portrait
| 358
| 
| Oil on canvas
| 1902
| 
| National Academy of Design, New York
|
|-
! scope="row" | Self-portrait
| 358A
| 
| Oil on canvas
| c. 1902
| 
| Hirshhorn Museum and Sculpture Garden, Washington, D.C.
|
|-
! scope="row" | Colonel Alfred Reynolds
| 359
| 
| Oil on canvas
| 1902
| 
| Taubman Museum of Art, Roanoke, Virginia
|
|-
! scope="row" | Signora Gomez D'Arza
| 360
| 
| Oil on canvas
| 1902
| 
| Metropolitan Museum of Art, New York
|
|-
! scope="row" | His Eminence Sebastiano Cardinal Martinelli
| 361
| 
| Oil on canvas
| 1901–02
| 
| Hammer Museum, Los Angeles
|
|-
! scope="row" | Perspective drawing for his Eminence Sebastiano Cardinal Martinelli
| 361A
|
| Drawing
| 
| 
| Joslyn Art Museum, Omaha, Nebraska
| 
|-
! scope="row" | Perspective drawing for his Eminence Sebastiano Cardinal Martinelli
| 361B
|
| Drawing
| 
| 
| Joslyn Art Museum, Omaha, Nebraska
| 
|-
! scope="row" | Very Reverend John J. Fedigan
| 362
| 
| Oil on canvas
| 1902
| 
| Collection of the Augustinian Province of St. Thomas of Villanova. On permanent loan to Villanova University, Villanova, Pennsylvania
| 
|-
! scope="row" | Sketch for the Very Reverend John J. Fedigan
| 363
| 
| Oil on canvas
| 
| 
| 
|Deaccessioned from the Hirshhorn Museum and Sculpture Garden.Auctioned at Christie's NY, September 27, 2011; sold for $10,625.
|-
! scope="row" | The Translator
| 364
| 
| Oil on canvas
| 1902
| 
| 
| Deassessioned from St. Charles Borromeo Seminary, Wynnewood, Pennsylvania
|-
! scope="row" | Monsignor James F. Loughlin
| 365
| 
| Oil on canvas
| 1902
| 
| 
| Deassessioned from St. Charles Borromeo Seminary, Wynnewood, Pennsylvania
|-
! scope="row" | Study for Monsignor James F. Loughlin
| 365A
| 
| Oil on cardboard mounted on wood
| 
| 
| 
| Originally double sided with G-332 until the two images were split.Auctioned at Bonham's San Francisco, November 29, 2005; sold for $15,000.
|-
! scope="row" | John Seely Hart
| 366
| 
| Oil on canvas
| 1902
| 
| Collection of the School District of Philadelphia, Philadelphia, Pennsylvania
| Dr. Hart (1810–1877) was principal of Philadelphia's Central High School when Eakins was a student. Eakins painted the posthumous portrait from a photograph.Rediscovered in 2004 by janitors in the boiler room of a Philadelphia school, it is currently in an undisclosed location.
|-
! scope="row" | Charles E. Dana
| 367
| 
| Oil on canvas
| c. 1902
| 
| Pennsylvania Academy of the Fine Arts, Philadelphia, Pennsylvania
|
|-
! scope="row" | The Young Man (Kern Dodge)
| 368
| 
| Oil on canvas
| c. 1902
| 
| Philadelphia Museum of Art, Philadelphia, Pennsylvania
|
|-
! scope="row" | Miss Mary Perkins (unfinished)
| 369
| 
| Oil on canvas
| c. 1902
| 
| 
| 
|-
! scope="row" | Girl with a Fan
| 370
| 
| Oil on canvas
| c. 1902
| 
| Pennsylvania Academy of Fine Arts, Philadelphia, Pennsylvania
|
|-
! scope="row" | Adam S. Bare
| 371
| 
| Oil on canvas
| 1903
| 
| 
| 
|-
! scope="row" | Walter Copeland Bryant
| 372
|
| Oil on canvas
| 1903
| 
| Collection of the Brockton Public Library, Brockton, Massachusetts
| 
|-
! scope="row" | Dr. Matthew H. Cryer
| 373
| 
| Oil on canvas
| 1903
| 
| Private collection
|
|-
! scope="row" | Archbishop William Henry Elder
| 374
| 
| Oil on canvas
| 1903
| 66 3/16 × 45 3/16
| Cincinnati Art Museum, Cincinnati, Ohio
|
|-
! scope="row" | Mother Patricia Waldron
| 375
| 
| Sketch. Oil on canvas mounted on cardboard
| 1903
| 
| Philadelphia Museum of Art, Philadelphia, Pennsylvania
| Study for completed portrait, G-487 (lost, probably destroyed). See below. 
|-
! scope="row" | Bishop Edmond F. Prendergast
| 376
|
| Oil on canvas
| 
| 
|
| Lost, possibly destroyed: "Murray told Eakins biographer Lloyd Goodrich that he had it 'from a reliable source' that the painting, which Murray considered 'superb' was somehow disposed of."
|-
! scope="row" | James A. Flaherty
| 377
| 
| Oil on canvas
| 1903
| 
| 
| Deassessioned from St. Charles Borromeo Seminary, Wynnewood, PennsylvaniaAuctioned at Christie's NY, May 19, 2016; sold for $185,000.
|-
! scope="row" | William B. Kurtz
| 378
| 
| Oil on canvas
| 1903
| 
| Philadelphia Museum of Art, Philadelphia, Pennsylvania
| 2015 bequest of Daniel W. Dietrich II.Goodrich, 1982, volume II, page 207
|-
! scope="row" | Miss Alice Kurtz
| 379
| 
| Oil on canvas
| 1903
|  
| Fogg Art Museum, Cambridge, Massachusetts
|
|-
! scope="row" | Mrs. Mary Hallock Greenewalt
| 380
| 
| Oil on canvas
| 1903
| 
| Wichita Art Museum, Wichita, Kansas
|
|-
! scope="row" | Dr. Frank Lindsay Greenewalt
| 381
| 
| Oil on canvas
| 1903
| 
|Private collection, Delaware
|
|-
! scope="row" | Dr. Frank Lindsay Greenewalt
| 381A
|
| Oil
| 
| 
| 
| 
|-
! scope="row" | Mrs. Anna A. Kershaw
| 382
| 
| Oil on canvas
| 1903
| 
| 
| Deaccessioned from Sheldon Museum of Art, Lincoln, Nebraska.Auctioned at Sotheby's NY, December 5, 2015; sold for $187,500.
|-
! scope="row" | Ruth (Portrait of Ruth Harding)
| 383
| 
| Oil on canvas
| 1903
| 
| White House Art Collection, Washington, D.C.
|
|-
! scope="row" | An Actress: Portrait of Suzanne Santje
| 384
| 
| Oil on canvas
| 1903
| 
| Philadelphia Museum of Art, Philadelphia, Pennsylvania
|
|-
! scope="row" | Study for An Actress
| 385
| 
| Oil on canvas mounted on cardboard
| 
| 
| 
|Deaccessioned from the Hirshhorn Museum and Sculpture Garden.Auctioned at Christie's NY, December 1, 2010; sold for $100,900.
|-
! scope="row" | Miss Betty Reynolds
| 386
| 
| Oil on canvas
| c. 1903
| 
| 
| Deaccessioned from the Hirshhorn Museum and Sculpture Garden.Auctioned at Christie's New York, March 1, 2012; sold for $22,500.
|-
! scope="row" | The Oboe Player
| 387
| 
| Oil on canvas
| 1903
| 
| Philadelphia Museum of Art, Philadelphia, Pennsylvania
|
|-
! scope="row" | Rear-Admiral Charles D. Sigsbee
| 388
| 
| Oil on canvas
| 1903
| 
| 
| Auctioned at Sotheby's NY, May 22, 2008; sold for $1,945,000.
|-
! scope="row" | Mrs. M.S. Stokes
| 389
| 
| Oil on canvas
| 1903
| 
| Arkell Museum, Canajoharie, New York
|
|-
! scope="row" | Mrs. Richard Day
| 390
| 
| Oil on canvas
| c. 1903
| 
| Hirshhorn Museum and Sculpture Garden, Washington, D.C.
|
|-
! scope="row" | Mother (Portrait of Annie Williams Gandy)
| 391
| 
| Oil on canvas
| c. 1903
| 
| Smithsonian American Art Museum
| Donated to the Smithsonian by Annie Gandy's daughters, Lucy Rodman and Helen Gandy.
|-
! scope="row" | Mrs. Helen MacKnight (also known as "The Lady in Grey" and "Portrait of a Mother")
| 392
| 
| Oil on canvas
| c. 1903
| 
| Hirshhorn Museum and Sculpture Garden, Washington, D.C.
|
|-
! scope="row" | Francesco Romano
| 393
| 
| 
| c. 1903
| 
| 
| Auctioned at Christie's NY, May 26, 1994; sold for $80,000.Auctioned at Sotheby's NY, November 29, 2012; sold for $146,500.
|-
! scope="row" | Robert C. Ogden
| 394
| 
| Oil on canvas
| 1904
| 
| 
|Deaccessioned from Hirshhorn Museum and Sculpture Garden.Auctioned at Christie's NY, May 20, 2009; sold for $338,500.Rosenzweig, 20
|-
! scope="row" | Study for Robert C. Ogden
| 394A
| 
| Oil
| 
| 
| 
| Deaccessioned from Hirshhorn Museum and Sculpture Garden.Auctioned at Christie's NY, March 3, 2011; sold for $32,500.
|-
! scope="row" | J. Carroll Beckwith
| 395
| 
| Oil on canvas
| 1904
| 
| San Diego Museum of Art, San Diego, California
|
|-
! scope="row" | Charles Percival Buck
| 396
| 
| Oil on canvas
| 1904
| 
| Princeton University Art Museum, Princeton, New Jersey
|
|-
! scope="row" | Mrs. James G. Carville (Portrait of Harriet Husson Carville)
| 397
| 
| Oil on canvas
| 1904
| 
| National Gallery of Art, Washington, D.C.
|
|-
! scope="row" | Mrs. Kern Dodge
| 398
| 
| Oil on canvas
| 1904
| 
| Private Collection. Los Angeles
|
|-
! scope="row" | Mrs. Kern Dodge
| 399
|
| Oil on canvas
| 
| 
| 
| 
|-
! scope="row" | Miss Beatrice Fenton (also known as "The Coral Necklace")
| 400
| 
| Oil on canvas
| 1904
| 
| Butler Institute of American Art, Youngstown, Ohio
|
|-
! scope="row" | William R. Hallowell
| 401
| 
| Oil on canvas
| 1904
| 
| 
| 
|-
! scope="row" | Music
| 402
| 
| Oil on canvas
| 1904
| 
| Albright-Knox Art Gallery, Buffalo, New York
|
|-
! scope="row" | Sketch for Music
| 403
| 
| Oil on canvas mounted on cardboard
| 
| 
| Philadelphia Museum of Art, Philadelphia, Pennsylvania
|
|-
! scope="row" | The Violinist
| 404
| 
| Oil on canvas
| 1904
| 
| Hirshhorn Museum and Sculpture Garden, Washington, D.C.
|
|-
! scope="row" | Samuel Myers
| 405
| 
| Oil on canvas
| 1904
| 
| Hirshhorn Museum and Sculpture Garden, Washington, D.C.
|
|-
! scope="row" | Frank B.A. Linton
| 406
| 
| Oil on canvas
| 1904
| 
| Hirshhorn Museum and Sculpture Garden, Washington, D.C.
|
|-
! scope="row" | Mrs. Edith Mahon
| 407
| 
| Oil on canvas
| 1904
| 
| Smith College Museum of Art, Northampton, Massachusetts
|
|-
! scope="row" | Rear-Admiral George W. Melville
| 408
| 
| Oil on canvas
| 1904
|
| Philadelphia Museum of Art, Philadelphia, Pennsylvania
| Eakins painted a later portrait of Melville, see G-420.
|-
! scope="row" | William Murray
| 409
| 
| Oil on canvas
| c. 1904
| 
| 
| 
|-
! scope="row" | Mrs. Matilda Searight
| 410
| 
| Oil on canvas
| 1904
| 
| La Salle University Art Gallery, Philadelphia, Pennsylvania
|
|-
! scope="row" | Edward Taylor Snow
| 411
| 
| Oil on canvas
| 1904
| 
| Philadelphia Museum of Art, Philadelphia, Pennsylvania
|
|-
! scope="row" | B.J. Blommers
| 412
| 
| 
| 1904
| 
| Toledo Museum of Art, Toledo, Ohio
|
|-
! scope="row" | Mrs. B.J. Blommers
| 413
|
| 
| 1904
| 
| 
| 
|-
! scope="row" | Charles P. Gruppe
| 414
| 
| Oil on canvas
| 1904
| 22" × 18"
| Private Collection. New York City
|
|-
! scope="row" | A. Bryan Wall
| 414A
| 
| Oil
| 
| 
| Bowdoin College Museum of Art, Brunswick, Maine
|
|-
! scope="row" | Joseph R. Woodwell
| 415
| 
| Oil on canvas
| 1904
| 
| Carnegie Museum of Art, Pittsburgh, Pennsylvania
|
|-
! scope="row" | William H. MacDowell
| 416
| 
| Oil on canvas
| c. 1904
| 
| Memorial Art Gallery, University of Rochester, New York
|
|-
! scope="row" | Walter MacDowell
| 417
| 
| Oil on canvas
| c. 1904
| 
| Taubman Museum of Art, Roanoke, Virginia
|
|-
! scope="row" | William H. Lippincott
| 418
|
| 
| Late 1904 or early 1905
| 
| 
| 
|-
! scope="row" | Edward W. Redfield
| 419
| 
| Oil on canvas
| 1905
| 
| National Academy of Design, New York
|
|-
! scope="row" | Rear-Admiral George W. Melville
| 420
| 
| Oil on canvas
| 1905
| 
| National Gallery of Art, Washington, D.C.
| Eakins painted an earlier portrait of Melville, see G-408.
|-
! scope="row" | Mrs. George Morris
| 421
|
| Oil on canvas
| 1905
| 
| 
| 
|-
! scope="row" | Professor William Smith Forbes
| 422
| 
| Oil on canvas
| 1905
| 
| Private collection
| Deaccessioned from Thomas Jefferson University, Philadelphia, Pennsylvania in 2007.
|-
! scope="row" | Charles L. Fussell
| 423
| 
| Oil on canvas
| c. 1905
| 
| Montclair Art Museum, Montclair, New Jersey
|
|-
! scope="row" | Study for Charles L. Fussell
| 423A
| 
| Oil on board
| c. 1905
| 
| 
| Deaccessioned from the Hirshhorn Museum and Sculpture Garden.Auctioned at Christie's NY, March 1, 2012; sold for $27,500.
|-
! scope="row" | Miss Florence Einstein
| 424
| 
| Oil on canvas
| 1905
| 
| Currier Museum of Art, Manchester, New Hampshire
|
|-
! scope="row" | Monsignor Diomede Falconio
| 425
| 
| Oil on canvas
| 1905
| 
| National Gallery of Art, Washington, D.C.
|
|-
! scope="row" | John B. Gest
| 426
| 
| Oil on canvas
| 1905
| 
| Museum of Fine Arts, Houston, Houston, Texas
|
|-
! scope="row" | Asbury.W. Lee
| 427
| 
| Oil on canvas
| 1905
| 
| Reynolda House Museum of American Art, Winston-Salem, North Carolina
|
|-
! scope="row" | Miss Elizabeth L. Burton
| 428
| 
| Oil on canvas
| c. 1905
| 
| Minneapolis Institute of Arts, Minneapolis, Minnesota
|
|-
! scope="row" | Dr. Thomas H. Fenton
| 429
| 
| Oil on canvas
| c. 1905
| 
| Delaware Art Museum, Wilmington, Delaware
|
|-
! scope="row" | Mrs. Louis Husson (Annie C. Lochrey)
| 430
| 
| Oil on canvas
| c. 1905
| 
| National Gallery of Art, Washington, D.C.
|
|-
! scope="row" | Maurice Feeley
| 431
| 
| Oil on canvas
| c. 1905
| 
| 
|Deaccessioned from the Hirshhorn Museum and Sculpture Garden.Auctioned at Christie's NY, March 3, 2011; sold for $27,500
|-
! scope="row" | Genjiro Yeto
| 432
|
| 
| 1906
| 
| 
| 
|-
! scope="row" | A Singer: Portrait of Mrs. W.H. Bowden
| 433
| 
| Oil on canvas
| 1906
| 
| Princeton University Art Museum, Princeton, New Jersey
|
|-
! scope="row" | A Singer: Portrait of Mrs. Leigo
| 434
| 
| Oil on canvas
| c. 1906
| 
| Berry-Hill Galleries, New York
|
|-
! scope="row" | Richard Wood
| 435
|
| Oil on canvas
| 1906
| 
| 
| 
|-
! scope="row" | Master Alfred Douty
| 436
| 
| Oil on canvas
| 1906
| 
| Santa Barbara Museum of Art, Santa Barbara, California
|
|-
! scope="row" | A Little Girl
| 437
| 
| Oil on canvas
| c. 1906
| 
| Philadelphia Museum of Art, Philadelphia, Pennsylvania
|
|-
! scope="row" | Monsignor James P. Turner
| 438
| 
| Oil on canvas
| c. 1906
| 
| Nelson-Atkins Museum of Art, Kansas City, Missouri
| Eakins painted an earlier head-and-bust portrait of Monsignor Turner (c. 1900), G-347. 
|-
! scope="row" | Sketches
| 439
| 
| Oil on cardboard
| 
| 
| Philadelphia Museum of Art, Philadelphia, Pennsylvania
| Double sided: one side is a sketch for Monsignor James P. Turner.The reverse is a sketch for William Rush and His Model (Honolulu), G-451. Related to G-454.
|-
! scope="row" | Thomas J. Eagan
| 440
| 
| Oil on canvas
| 1907
| 
| Terra Museum, Chicago, Illinois
| Auctioned at Christie's NY, May 21, 1998; sold for $240,000.
|-
! scope="row" | Dr. Albert C. Getchell
| 441
| 
| Oil on canvas
| 1907
| 
| North Carolina Museum of Art, Raleigh, North Carolina
|
|-
! scope="row" | Dr. William Thomson
| 442
| 
| Oil on canvas
| 1907
| 
| Mütter Museum, College of Physicians of Philadelphia, Philadelphia, Pennsylvania
|
|-
! scope="row" | Dr. William Thomson (unfinished)
| 443
| 
| Oil on canvas
| 
| 
| National Gallery of Art, Washington, D.C.Myers, 83–84
|
|-
! scope="row" | Major Manuel Waldteufel
| 444
| 
| Oil on canvas
| 1907
| 
| Hirschl and Adler Galleries, New York
| Deaccessioned from French Benevolent Society of Philadelphia, 2003.Auctioned at Christie's NY, May 21, 2008; sold for $289,000.
|-
! scope="row" | William Rush and His Model (Brooklyn)
| 445
| 
| Oil on canvas
| 1908
| 
| Brooklyn Museum of Art, New York
|
|-
! scope="row" | Sketch for William Rush and His Model (Brooklyn), G-445
| 446
| 
| Oil on wood
| 1908
| 8¾ × 10
| 
| 
|-
! scope="row" | Sketch for William Rush and His Model (Brooklyn), G-445
| 447
| 
| Oil on wood
| 
| 
| Hirshhorn Museum and Sculpture Garden, Washington, D.C.
|
|-
! scope="row" | Studies of Rush
| 448
|
| Oil on wood
| 
| 
| 
| Originally a collage with G-448A and G-448B until the images were split.
|-
! scope="row" | Study of Rush
| 448A
|
| Oil on wood
| 
| 
| 
| Originally a collage with G-448 and G-448B until the images were split.
|-
! scope="row" | Study of Rush
| 448B
|
| Oil on wood
| 
| 
| 
| Originally a collage with G-448 and G-448A until the images were split.
|-
! scope="row" | Study of RushStudy for William Rush and His Model (Brooklyn), G-445.
| 449
| 
| Oil on canvas
| 
| 
| 
| Auctioned at Heritage Dallas, November 9, 2009; sold for $100,380.
|-
! scope="row" | Study for The Chaperone (formerly called The Negress)Study for William Rush and His Model (Brooklyn), G-445.
| 450
| 
| Oil on canvas
| c. 1908
| 
| National Gallery of Art, Washington, DC
|
|-
! scope="row" | William Rush and His Model (Honolulu)
| 451
| 
| Oil on canvas
| 1907–1908
| 
| Honolulu Museum of Art, Honolulu, Hawaii
| In Eakins Revealed (pp. 369–371), author Henry Adams claims that Mary Adeline "Addie" Williams (G-323), an Eakins family friend, was the nude model for William Rush and his Model.Related studies: G-445, G-446, G-447, G-452, G-453 and G-454.
|-
! scope="row" | The ModelStudy for William Rush and His Model (Honolulu), G-451
| 452
| 
| Oil on canvas
| 
| 
| Crystal Bridges Museum of American Art, Bentonville, Arkansas
|Auctioned at Sotheby's New York, May 22, 2008, sold for $1,273,000.
|-
! scope="row" | William Rush and His Model
| 453
| 
| Oil on canvas
| 1908
| 
| Smithsonian American Art Museum, Washington, D.C.
|
|-
! scope="row" | Study for "William Rush's Model"
| 454
| 
| Oil on canvas
| c. 1908
| 
| 
| Related to G-439.Deaccessioned from Hirshhorn Museum and Sculpture Garden.Auctioned at Christie's New York, May 20, 2009; sold for $122,500.Offered at auctioned by Sotheby's New York, May 23, 2017, Lot 77, estimate: $80,000-120,000. Unsold.
|-
! scope="row" | Miss Eleanor S.F. Pue
| 455
| 
| Oil on canvas
| 1907
| 
| 
| Deaccessioned from Virginia Museum of Fine Arts. Auctioned at Freeman's, Philadelphia, December 3, 2017, sold for $40,000.
|-
! scope="row" | Miss Rebecca MacDowell
| 456
| 
| Oil on canvas
| c. 1908
| 
| 
| Offered for auction at Bonham's, New York, November 28, 2012, Lot 82, estimate: $70,000-90,000. Unsold.
|-
! scope="row" | The Old-Fashioned Dress: Portrait of Miss Helen Parker
| 457
| 
| Oil on canvas
| c. 1908
| 
| Philadelphia Museum of Art, Philadelphia, Pennsylvania
|
|-
! scope="row" | Sketch for the Old-Fashioned Dress
| 458
| 
| Oil on cardboard
| 
| 
| Collection of Mr. and Mrs. Daniel Dietrich II
|
|-
! scope="row" | Study for the Old-Fashioned Dress
| 459
| 
| Oil on canvas
| 1908
| 
| Collection of Mr. and Mrs. Daniel Dietrich IISewell, 1982, 131
|
|-
! scope="row" | Mrs. Lucy Langdon W. Wilson
| 460
| 
| Oil on canvas
| 1908
| 
| 
| Auctioned at Sotheby's NY, December 3, 1998; sold for $60,000.
|-
! scope="row" | Mrs. Lucy Langdon W. Wilson (second version)
| 461
|
| Oil on canvas
| Early 1909
| 
| 
| 
|-
! scope="row" | Dr. William P. Wilson
| 462
|
| Oil on canvas
| 1909
| 
| 
| 
|-
! scope="row" | Dr. Henry Beates Jr.
| 463
|
| Oil on canvas
| 1909
| 
| 
| 
|-
! scope="row" | Henry Beates
| 464
|
| Oil on canvas
| c. 1909
| 
| 
| 
|-
! scope="row" | Edward A. Schmidt
| 465
|
| Oil on canvas
| c. 1909
| 
| 
| 
|-
! scope="row" | Reverend Cornelius J. O'Neill
| 466
|
| Oil on canvas
| c. 1909
| 
| 
| 
|-
! scope="row" | John J. Borie
| 467
| 
| Oil on canvas
| 1896-98
| 
| Hood Museum of Art, Dartmouth College,Hanover, New Hampshire
|
|-
! scope="row" | Mrs. Nicholas Douty
| 468
| 
| Oil on canvas
| 1910
| 
| Cummer Gallery of Art, Jacksonville, Florida
|
|-
! scope="row" | Dr. Gilbert Lafayette Parker
| 469
| 
| Oil on canvas
| 1910
| 
| 
| Auctioned at Sotheby's NY, May 29, 1986; sold for $125,000.Auctioned at Christie's NY, May 23, 2017, Lot 59, estimate: $80,000-120,000, Unsold.
|-
! scope="row" | Mrs. Gilbert Parker
| 470
| 
| Oil on canvas
| 1910
| 
| Museum of Fine Arts, Boston, Boston, Massachusetts
|
|-
! scope="row" | Gilbert Sunderland Parker
| 471
|
| Oil on canvas
| 1910
| 
| 
| 
|-
! scope="row" | Ernest Lee Parker
| 472
| 
| Oil on canvas
| 1910
| 
| 
| Deaccessioned from the Westmoreland Museum of American Art.Auctioned at Christie's NY, December 5, 2002; sold for $101,575.
|-
! scope="row" | President Rutherford B. Hayes
| 473
| 
| Oil on canvas
| 1912 or 1913
| 
| Philipse Manor Hall, Yonkers, New York
|
|-
! scope="row" | Dr. Edward Anthony Spitzka
| 474
| 
| Oil on canvas
| c. 1913
| 
| Hirshhorn Museum and Sculpture Garden, Washington, D.C.
| Eakins' last painting.This originally showed a full length Dr. Spitzka holding the cast of a brain. Sometime after it was cataloged in the 1933 Goodrich catalog (measuring 84×43½ inches), someone cut away the rest of the painting, leaving only the head and bust (30½×25? inches).
|-
! scope="row" | President Rutherford B. Hayes
| 475
|
| 
| 1877
| 
| 
| "Probably no longer in existence"
|-
! scope="row" | James L. Wood
| 476
|
| 
| c. 1890
| 
| 
| "Probably no longer in existence"
|-
! scope="row" | William Rudolf O'Donovan
| 477
|
| 
| 1891 or early 1892
| 
| 
| "Probably no longer in existence"
|-
! scope="row" | Miss Emily Sartain
| 478
| 
| 
| Sometime in the 1890s
| 
| 
| Thought to have been lost ("Probably no longer in existence".) Later rediscovered. Passed down through the Sartain family to the Babcock Galleries, and was sold to Rita and Daniel Fraad in 1957.Auctioned at Sotheby's NY, December 1, 2004; sold for $170,000.
|-
! scope="row" | Miss Emily Sartain
| 479
| 
|
| Sometime in the 1890s
| 
| 
| "Probably no longer in existence"
|-
! scope="row" | Dr. Hugh A. Clarke
| 480
| 
|
| c. 1893
| 
| 
| "Probably no longer in existence"
|-
! scope="row" | James MacAlister
| 481
|
| 
| c. 1893
| 
| 
| "Probably no longer in existence"
|-
! scope="row" | Circus People
| 482
|
| 
| Before 1876
| 
| 
| Sketch. "Probably no longer in existence"
|-
! scope="row" | Stewart Culin
| 483
|
| 
| c. 1899
| 
| 
| "Probably no longer in existence"
|-
! scope="row" | Dr. George B. Wood
| 484
|
| 
| c. 1900
| 
| 
| "Probably no longer in existence"
|-
! scope="row" | Dr. Patrick J. Garvey
| 485
| 
| Oil on canvas
| 1902
| 
| 
| Thought to have been destroyed, rediscovered in 1959.Deassessioned from St. Charles Borromeo Seminary, Wynnewood, Pennsylvania, 2014.Offered for auction at Christie's New York, November 21, 2017, Lot 91, estimate: $70,000-100,000. Unsold.
|-
! scope="row" | Right Reverend Denis J. Dougherty
| 486
| 
| 
| 1903
| 
|Private Collection
| Related to a full-length portrait of Rev. Denis J. Dougherty (c. 1906), G-438.  The subject later became a Cardinal and Archbishop of Philadelphia
|-
! scope="row" | Mother Patricia Waldron
| 487
|
| 
| 1903
| 
| 
| "Probably no longer in existence" – loaned by the Sisters of Mercy to William Antrim, who had been commissioned to paint a new portrait of Waldron. Antrim stored the portrait in the attic of his studio. The portrait was lost when the building was demolished. For sketch, see above, G-375.
|-
! scope="row" | Mrs. Margaret Jane Gish
| 488
|
| 
| c. 1903
| 
| 
| "Probably no longer in existence"
|-
! scope="row" | Robert C. Ogden
| 489
|
| 
| 
| 
| 
| "Probably no longer in existence"
|-
! scope="row" | Dr. J. William White
| 490
|
| 
| 1904
| 
| 
| "Probably no longer in existence"
|-
! scope="row" | Adolphie Borie
| 491
|
| 
| c. 1910
| 
| 
| "Probably no longer in existence"
|-
! scope="row" | Mrs. Charles Lester Leonard
| 492
|
| 
| 1895
| 
| 
| No longer in existence
|-
! scope="row" | Mrs. Hubbard
| 493
|
| 
| c. 1895
| 
| 
| No longer in existence
|-
! scope="row" | Mrs. McKeever
| 494
|
| 
| 1898
| 
| 
| No longer in existence
|-
! scope="row" | Bishop Edmond F. Prendergast
| 495
|
| Oil on canvas
| c. 1903
| 
|
| No longer in existence
|-
! scope="row" | Frank W. Stokes
| 496
|
| 
| 1903
| 
|
| No longer in existence
|-
! scope="row" | Edward S. Buckley
| 497
|
| 
| 1906
| 
|
| No longer in existence. According to Buckley's daughter: "It was so unsatisfactory that we destroyed it, not wishing his descendants to think of their grandfather as resembling the portrait."
|-
! scope="row" | Studies for William Rush and His Model| 498
| 
| Sculpture, pigmented wax
| 1876–1877
| 
| Philadelphia Museum of Art, Philadelphia, Pennsylvania
| Five studies
|-
! scope="row" | The Mare "Josephine"
| 499
|
| Sculpture, bronze
| 1878,cast 1930
| Height: 22.125 in (56.2 cm)
| Philadelphia Museum of Art, Philadelphia, Pennsylvania
| Quarter-size model.Josephine was the lead horse in The Fairman Rogers Four-in-Hand (G-133). Eakins and his students created a life-size plaster model of her in 1878. Following her natural death, 1881, the carcass was dissected and used to create plaster écorché models for teaching equine anatomy.
|-
! scope="row" | Horse Skeleton
| 500
| 
| Sculpture, painted plaster
| 1878
| 11.25 x 14.375 x 2.125 in (28.5 x 36.3 x 5.3 cm) 
| Hirshhorn Museum and Sculpture Garden, Washington, D.C.
| Eighth-size model.A plaster cast is at the University of Michigan Museum of Art. A 1930 bronze cast is at the Butler Institute of American Art.
|-
! scope="row" | The Mare "Josephine": Écorché
| 501
| 
| Sculpture, painted plaster
| 1882
| 22 x 24 x 4 in(55.88 x 60.96 x 10.16 cm)
| National Gallery of Art, Washington, D.C.
| Quarter-size model.An edition of 10 bronze casts was made of this in 1979. These are at the Hood Museum of Art, Harvard Art Museums, Brandywine River Museum, Crystal Bridges Museum of American Art, and elsewhere. A painted plaster relief is at the University of Michigan Museum of Art.
|-
! scope="row" | The Mare "Josephine": Écorché
| 502
|
| Sculpture, painted plaster
| 1882
| 22.25 x 31 x 3 in (56.52 x 78.74 x 7.62 cm)
| Pennsylvania Academy of the Fine Arts, Philadelphia, Pennsylvania
| Quarter-size model.A 1930 bronze cast is at the Philadelphia Museum of Art.
|-
! scope="row" | Four models of horses for The Fairman Rogers Four-in-Hand| 503
|
| Sculpture, bronze with marble bases
| 1879,cast 1946
| Lengths: 11.75 in (29.8 cm)11.875 in (30.2 cm)11.938 in (30.3 cm)12.25 in (31.1 cm)
| Philadelphia Museum of Art, Philadelphia, Pennsylvania
| Eighth-size models.
|-
! scope="row" | Spinning
| 504
| 
| Sculpture, painted plaster
| late-1882/ early-1883
| 21 x 17.375 x 4.25 in (53.24 x 44.133 x 10.8 cm)
| Pennsylvania Academy of the Fine Arts, Philadelphia, Pennsylvania
| PAFA also owns an 1886 bronze cast.An 1886 bronze cast is at the Philadelphia Museum of Art.
|-
! scope="row" | Knitting
| 505
| 
| Sculpture, painted plaster
| 1881
| 20.75 x 17.25 x 4.5 in (52.7 x 43.82 x 11.43 cm)
| Pennsylvania Academy of the Fine Arts, Philadelphia, Pennsylvania
| PAFA also owns an 1886 bronze cast.An 1886 bronze cast is at the Philadelphia Museum of Art.
|-
! scope="row" | Arcadia
| 506
| 
| Sculpture, painted plaster
| 1883
| 11.875 x 24.25 x 2.375 in (29.9 x 61.3 x 5.7 cm)
| Hirshhorn Museum and Sculpture Garden, Washington, D.C.
| Plaster casts are at the Philadelphia Museum of Art, Yale University Art Gallery, and elsewhere. A 1930 bronze cast is in the collection of Jamie Wyeth.
|-
! scope="row" | An Arcadian
| 507
| 
| Sculpture, painted plaster
| 1883
| 
| Pennsylvania Academy of the Fine Arts, Philadelphia, Pennsylvania
| Susan Macdowell Eakins posed as the model.
|-
! scope="row" | The Youth Playing the Pipes
| 508
| 
| Sculpture, painted plaster
| 1883
| 20.125 x 11.5 x 1.75 in (51 x 29.1 x 4.2 cm)
| Philadelphia Museum of Art, Philadelphia, Pennsylvania
| Plaster casts are at the Pennsylvania Academy of the Fine Arts, and elsewhere. A 1930 bronze cast is at the Hirshhorn Museum and Sculpture Garden.
|-
! scope="row" | Abraham Lincoln's horse
| 509
| 
| Sculpture
| 1893–1894
| 
| Soldiers' and Sailors' Memorial Arch, Prospect Park, Brooklyn, New York City
| William Rudolf O'Donovan modeled the figure of Abraham Lincoln.Originally paired with G-509A in the 1933 Goodrich catalog.
|-
! scope="row" | General Grant's Horse
| 509A
| Full-size plaster model of Clinker.
| Sculpture, bronze
| 1892
| 
| Soldiers' and Sailors' Memorial Arch, Prospect Park, Brooklyn, New York City
| William Rudolf O'Donovan modeled the figure of Ulysses S. Grant.Originally listed as G-509 in the 1933 Goodrich catalog.
|-
! scope="row" | Clinker
| 510
|
| Sculpture, bronze
| 1892, cast 1930
| 6.25 x 6.25 x 2 in (15.8 x 15.8 x 4.9 cm)
| Hirshhorn Museum and Sculpture Garden, Washington, D.C.
| Sixteenth-size model.
|-
! scope="row" | Clinker
| 511
| 
| Sculpture, painted plaster
| 1892
| 25.34 x 25.34 x 4.5 in (65.4 x 65.4 x 11.4 cm)
| Philadelphia Museum of Art, Philadelphia, Pennsylvania
| Quarter-size model.A 1930 bronze cast is also at the Philadelphia Museum of Art.
|-
! scope="row" | Billy
| 512
|
| Sculpture, plaster
| c. 1892–1893
| 
| 
|  
|-
! scope="row" | The American Army Crossing the Delaware
| 513
|
| Sculpture, bronze relief
| c. 1893
| 
| New Jersey State Museum, Trenton, New Jersey
| 
|-
! scope="row" | The Opening of the Fight, The Battle of Trenton
| 514
|
| Sculpture, bronze relief
| c. 1893
| 
| New Jersey State Museum, Trenton, New Jersey
| 
|-
! scope="row" | Man on Horseback: Relief
| 514A
| 
| 
| 
| 
| Hirshhorn Museum and Sculpture Garden, Washington, D.C.
| 
|-
! scope="row" | Mrs. Mary Hallock Greenewalt
| 515
| 
| Sculpture, bronze relief
| 1905
| 
| Delaware Art Museum, Wilmington, Delaware
|
|}

 Notes 

 References 

 Berger, Martin A. Man Made: Thomas Eakins and the Construction of Gilded Age Manhood. Berkeley: University Of California Press, 2000. 
 Bolger, Doreen; Cash, Sarah; et al. Thomas Eakins and the Swimming Picture. Amon Carter Museum, 1996. 
 Braddock, Alan C. Thomas Eakins and the Cultures of Modernity. University of California Press, 2009. 
 Cooper, Helen A. Thomas Eakins: The Rowing Pictures. Yale University Art Gallery, 1996. 
 Foster, Kathleen A. Thomas Eakins Rediscovered: Charles Bregler's Thomas Eakins Collection at the Pennsylvania Academy of the Fine Arts. Yale University Press, 1997. .
 Goodrich, Lloyd. Thomas Eakins: His Life and Works. William Edwin Rudge Printing House. New York, 1933. Catalogue of Works. Pages 161–209.
 Hendricks, Gordon. The Life and Works of Thomas Eakins. New York: Grossman Publishers, 1974. 
 Hendricks, Gordon. The Photographs of Thomas Eakins. New York: Grossman Publishers, 1972. 
 Homer, William Innes. The Paris Letters of Thomas Eakins. Princeton University Press, 2009. 
 Homer, William Innes. Thomas Eakins: His Life and His Art. Abbeville Press, 1992. 
 Homer, William Innes. Eakins at Avondale and Thomas Eakins: A Personal Collection. Science Press, 1980. Library of Congress catalogue no. 79-57527
 Hoopes, Donelson F. Eakins Watercolors. Watson-Guptill Publications, 1971. Reprinted 1985. 
 Johns, Elizabeth. Thomas Eakins: The Heroism of Modern Life. Princeton University Press, 1991. .
 Myers, Jane E. Eakins and the Medical Milieu: The Physicians' Portraits. Master's Thesis, December 1982.
 Milroy, Elizabeth Lamotte Cates. Thomas Eakins Artistic Training, 1860–1870. Phd Dissertation, University of Pennsylvania, 1986
 Rosenzweig, Phlyllis D. Thomas Eakins Collection of the Hirshhorn Museum and Sculpture Garden. Washington DC: Smithsonian Institution Press, 1977.
 Siegl, Theodor. The Thomas Eakins Collection. Philadelphia Museum of Art, 1978. 
 Sewell, Darrel. Thomas Eakins: Artist of Philadelphia. Philadelphia Museum of Art, 1982. 
 Sewell, Darrel; et al. Thomas Eakins. Yale University Press, 2001. .
 Wilmerding, John. Thomas Eakins. Washington, DC: Smithsonian Institution Press, 1993. 
 Wilmerding, John. Compass and Clock: Defining Moments in American Culture : 1800, 1850, 1900.'' Harry N. Abrams, 1999.

External links 
 Thomas Cowperthwait Eakins Virtual Gallery
 CGFA – Thomas Eakins paintings
 Smithsonian Catalog of Eakins' works
 Artcyclopedia entry for Thomas Eakins

Lists of works of art